= List of human protein-coding genes 5 =

Human protein-coding genes listed in the HGNC database
index	Gene symbol	HGNC and UniProt ID(s)
9001	LTBR	HGNC:6718; P36941
9002	LTC4S	HGNC:6719; Q16873
9003	LTF	HGNC:6720; P02788
9004	LTK	HGNC:6721; P29376
9005	LTN1	HGNC:13082; O94822
9006	LTO1	HGNC:17589; Q8WV07
9007	LTV1	HGNC:21173; Q96GA3
9008	LUC7L	HGNC:6723; Q9NQ29
9009	LUC7L2	HGNC:21608; Q9Y383
9010	LUC7L3	HGNC:24309; O95232
9011	LUM	HGNC:6724; P51884
9012	LURAP1	HGNC:32327; Q96LR2
9013	LURAP1L	HGNC:31452; Q8IV03
9014	LUZP1	HGNC:14985; Q86V48
9015	LUZP2	HGNC:23206; Q86TE4
9016	LUZP4	HGNC:24971; Q9P127
9017	LVRN	HGNC:26904; Q6Q4G3
9018	LXN	HGNC:13347; Q9BS40
9019	LY6D	HGNC:13348; Q14210
9020	LY6E	HGNC:6727; Q16553
9021	LY6G5B	HGNC:13931; Q8NDX9
9022	LY6G5C	HGNC:13932; Q5SRR4
9023	LY6G6C	HGNC:13936; O95867
9024	LY6G6D	HGNC:13935; O95868
9025	LY6G6F	HGNC:13933; Q5SQ64
9026	LY6H	HGNC:6728; O94772
9027	LY6K	HGNC:24225; Q17RY6
9028	LY6L	HGNC:52284; H3BQJ8
9029	LY6S	HGNC:54397; P0DTL4
9030	LY9	HGNC:6730; Q9HBG7
9031	LY75	HGNC:6729; O60449
9032	LY86	HGNC:16837; O95711
9033	LY96	HGNC:17156; Q9Y6Y9
9034	LYAR	HGNC:26021; Q9NX58
9035	LYG1	HGNC:27014; Q8N1E2
9036	LYG2	HGNC:29615; Q86SG7
9037	LYL1	HGNC:6734; P12980
9038	LYN	HGNC:6735; P07948
9039	LYNX1	HGNC:29604; P0DP58
9040	LYPD1	HGNC:28431; Q8N2G4
9041	LYPD2	HGNC:25215; Q6UXB3
9042	LYPD3	HGNC:24880; O95274
9043	LYPD4	HGNC:28659; Q6UWN0
9044	LYPD5	HGNC:26397; Q6UWN5
9045	LYPD6	HGNC:28751; Q86Y78
9046	LYPD6B	HGNC:27018; Q8NI32
9047	LYPD8	HGNC:44208; Q6UX82
9048	LYPLA1	HGNC:6737; O75608
9049	LYPLA2	HGNC:6738; O95372
9050	LYPLAL1	HGNC:20440; Q5VWZ2
9051	LYRM1	HGNC:25074; O43325
9052	LYRM2	HGNC:25229; Q9NU23
9053	LYRM4	HGNC:21365; Q9HD34
9054	LYRM7	HGNC:28072; Q5U5X0
9055	LYRM9	HGNC:27314; A8MSI8
9056	LYSET	HGNC:20218; Q8N6I4
9057	LYSMD1	HGNC:32070; Q96S90
9058	LYSMD2	HGNC:28571; Q8IV50
9059	LYSMD3	HGNC:26969; Q7Z3D4
9060	LYSMD4	HGNC:26571; Q5XG99
9061	LYST	HGNC:1968; Q99698
9062	LYVE1	HGNC:14687; Q9Y5Y7
9063	LYZ	HGNC:6740; P61626
9064	LYZL1	HGNC:30502; Q6UWQ5
9065	LYZL2	HGNC:29613; Q7Z4W2
9066	LYZL4	HGNC:28387; Q96KX0
9067	LYZL6	HGNC:29614; O75951
9068	LZIC	HGNC:17497; Q8WZA0
9069	LZTFL1	HGNC:6741; Q9NQ48
9070	LZTR1	HGNC:6742; Q8N653
9071	LZTS1	HGNC:13861; Q9Y250
9072	LZTS2	HGNC:29381; Q9BRK4
9073	LZTS3	HGNC:30139; O60299
9074	M1AP	HGNC:25183; Q8TC57
9075	M6PR	HGNC:6752; P20645
9076	MAB21L1	HGNC:6757; Q13394
9077	MAB21L2	HGNC:6758; Q9Y586
9078	MAB21L3	HGNC:26787; Q8N8X9
9079	MAB21L4	HGNC:26216; Q08AI8
9080	MACC1	HGNC:30215; Q6ZN28
9081	MACF1	HGNC:13664; O94854, Q9UPN3
9082	MACIR	HGNC:25052; Q96GV9
9083	MACO1	HGNC:25572; Q8N5G2
9084	MACROD1	HGNC:29598; Q9BQ69
9085	MACROD2	HGNC:16126; A1Z1Q3
9086	MACROH2A1	HGNC:4740; O75367
9087	MACROH2A2	HGNC:14453; Q9P0M6
9088	MAD1L1	HGNC:6762; Q9Y6D9
9089	MAD2L1	HGNC:6763; Q13257
9090	MAD2L1BP	HGNC:21059; Q15013
9091	MAD2L2	HGNC:6764; Q9UI95
9092	MADCAM1	HGNC:6765; Q13477
9093	MADD	HGNC:6766; Q8WXG6
9094	MAEA	HGNC:13731; Q7L5Y9
9095	MAEL	HGNC:25929; Q96JY0
9096	MAF	HGNC:6776; O75444
9097	MAF1	HGNC:24966; Q9H063
9098	MAFA	HGNC:23145; Q8NHW3
9099	MAFB	HGNC:6408; Q9Y5Q3
9100	MAFF	HGNC:6780; Q9ULX9
9101	MAFG	HGNC:6781; O15525
9102	MAFK	HGNC:6782; O60675
9103	MAG	HGNC:6783; P20916
9104	MAGEA1	HGNC:6796; P43355
9105	MAGEA2	HGNC:6800; P43356
9106	MAGEA2B	HGNC:19340; P43356
9107	MAGEA3	HGNC:6801; P43357
9108	MAGEA4	HGNC:6802; P43358
9109	MAGEA6	HGNC:6804; P43360
9110	MAGEA8	HGNC:6806; P43361
9111	MAGEA9	HGNC:6807; P43362
9112	MAGEA9B	HGNC:31909; P43362
9113	MAGEA10	HGNC:6797; P43363
9114	MAGEA11	HGNC:6798; P43364
9115	MAGEA12	HGNC:6799; P43365
9116	MAGEB1	HGNC:6808; P43366
9117	MAGEB2	HGNC:6809; O15479
9118	MAGEB3	HGNC:6810; O15480
9119	MAGEB4	HGNC:6811; O15481
9120	MAGEB5	HGNC:23795; Q9BZ81
9121	MAGEB6	HGNC:23796; Q8N7X4
9122	MAGEB6B	HGNC:28824; A0A0J9YX57
9123	MAGEB10	HGNC:25377; Q96LZ2
9124	MAGEB16	HGNC:21188; A2A368
9125	MAGEB17	HGNC:17418; A8MXT2
9126	MAGEB18	HGNC:28515; Q96M61
9127	MAGEC1	HGNC:6812; O60732
9128	MAGEC2	HGNC:13574; Q9UBF1
9129	MAGEC3	HGNC:23798; Q8TD91
9130	MAGED1	HGNC:6813; Q9Y5V3
9131	MAGED2	HGNC:16353; Q9UNF1
9132	MAGED4	HGNC:23793; Q96JG8
9133	MAGED4B	HGNC:22880; Q96JG8
9134	MAGEE1	HGNC:24934; Q9HCI5
9135	MAGEE2	HGNC:24935; Q8TD90
9136	MAGEF1	HGNC:29639; Q9HAY2
9137	MAGEH1	HGNC:24092; Q9H213
9138	MAGEL2	HGNC:6814; Q9UJ55
9139	MAGI1	HGNC:946; Q96QZ7
9140	MAGI2	HGNC:18957; Q86UL8
9141	MAGI3	HGNC:29647; Q5TCQ9
9142	MAGIX	HGNC:30006; Q9H6Y5
9143	MAGOH	HGNC:6815; P61326
9144	MAGOHB	HGNC:25504; Q96A72
9145	MAGT1	HGNC:28880; Q9H0U3
9146	MAIP1	HGNC:26198; Q8WWC4
9147	MAJIN	HGNC:27441; Q3KP22
9148	MAK	HGNC:6816; P20794
9149	MAK16	HGNC:13703; Q9BXY0
9150	MAL	HGNC:6817; P21145
9151	MAL2	HGNC:13634; Q969L2
9152	MALL	HGNC:6818; Q13021
9153	MALRD1	HGNC:24331; Q5VYJ5
9154	MALSU1	HGNC:21721; Q96EH3
9155	MALT1	HGNC:6819; Q9UDY8
9156	MAMDC2	HGNC:23673; Q7Z304
9157	MAMDC4	HGNC:24083; Q6UXC1
9158	MAML1	HGNC:13632; Q92585
9159	MAML2	HGNC:16259; Q8IZL2
9160	MAML3	HGNC:16272; Q96JK9
9161	MAMLD1	HGNC:2568; Q13495
9162	MAMSTR	HGNC:26689; Q6ZN01
9163	MAN1A1	HGNC:6821; P33908
9164	MAN1A2	HGNC:6822; O60476
9165	MAN1B1	HGNC:6823; Q9UKM7
9166	MAN1C1	HGNC:19080; Q9NR34
9167	MAN2A1	HGNC:6824; Q16706
9168	MAN2A2	HGNC:6825; P49641
9169	MAN2B1	HGNC:6826; O00754
9170	MAN2B2	HGNC:29623; Q9Y2E5
9171	MAN2C1	HGNC:6827; Q9NTJ4
9172	MANBA	HGNC:6831; O00462
9173	MANBAL	HGNC:15799; Q9NQG1
9174	MANEA	HGNC:21072; Q5SRI9
9175	MANEAL	HGNC:26452; Q5VSG8
9176	MANF	HGNC:15461; P55145
9177	MANSC1	HGNC:25505; Q9H8J5
9178	MANSC4	HGNC:40023; A6NHS7
9179	MAOA	HGNC:6833; P21397
9180	MAOB	HGNC:6834; P27338
9181	MAP1A	HGNC:6835; P78559
9182	MAP1B	HGNC:6836; P46821
9183	MAP1LC3A	HGNC:6838; Q9H492
9184	MAP1LC3B	HGNC:13352; Q9GZQ8
9185	MAP1LC3B2	HGNC:34390; A6NCE7
9186	MAP1LC3C	HGNC:13353; Q9BXW4
9187	MAP1S	HGNC:15715; Q66K74
9188	MAP2	HGNC:6839; P11137
9189	MAP2K1	HGNC:6840; Q02750
9190	MAP2K2	HGNC:6842; P36507
9191	MAP2K3	HGNC:6843; P46734
9192	MAP2K4	HGNC:6844; P45985
9193	MAP2K5	HGNC:6845; Q13163
9194	MAP2K6	HGNC:6846; P52564
9195	MAP2K7	HGNC:6847; O14733
9196	MAP3K1	HGNC:6848; Q13233
9197	MAP3K2	HGNC:6854; Q9Y2U5
9198	MAP3K3	HGNC:6855; Q99759
9199	MAP3K4	HGNC:6856; Q9Y6R4
9200	MAP3K5	HGNC:6857; Q99683
9201	MAP3K6	HGNC:6858; O95382
9202	MAP3K7	HGNC:6859; O43318
9203	MAP3K7CL	HGNC:16457; P57077
9204	MAP3K8	HGNC:6860; P41279
9205	MAP3K9	HGNC:6861; P80192
9206	MAP3K10	HGNC:6849; Q02779
9207	MAP3K11	HGNC:6850; Q16584
9208	MAP3K12	HGNC:6851; Q12852
9209	MAP3K13	HGNC:6852; O43283
9210	MAP3K14	HGNC:6853; Q99558
9211	MAP3K15	HGNC:31689; Q6ZN16
9212	MAP3K19	HGNC:26249; Q56UN5
9213	MAP3K20	HGNC:17797; Q9NYL2
9214	MAP3K21	HGNC:29798; Q5TCX8
9215	MAP4	HGNC:6862; P27816
9216	MAP4K1	HGNC:6863; Q92918
9217	MAP4K2	HGNC:6864; Q12851
9218	MAP4K3	HGNC:6865; Q8IVH8
9219	MAP4K4	HGNC:6866; O95819
9220	MAP4K5	HGNC:6867; Q9Y4K4
9221	MAP6	HGNC:6868; Q96JE9
9222	MAP6D1	HGNC:25753; Q9H9H5
9223	MAP7	HGNC:6869; Q14244
9224	MAP7D1	HGNC:25514; Q3KQU3
9225	MAP7D2	HGNC:25899; Q96T17
9226	MAP7D3	HGNC:25742; Q8IWC1
9227	MAP9	HGNC:26118; Q49MG5
9228	MAP10	HGNC:29265; Q9P2G4
9229	MAPDA	HGNC:31853; Q6DHV7
9230	MAPK1	HGNC:6871; P28482
9231	MAPK1IP1L	HGNC:19840; Q8NDC0
9232	MAPK3	HGNC:6877; P27361
9233	MAPK4	HGNC:6878; P31152
9234	MAPK6	HGNC:6879; Q16659
9235	MAPK7	HGNC:6880; Q13164
9236	MAPK8	HGNC:6881; P45983
9237	MAPK8IP1	HGNC:6882; Q9UQF2
9238	MAPK8IP2	HGNC:6883; Q13387
9239	MAPK8IP3	HGNC:6884; Q9UPT6
9240	MAPK9	HGNC:6886; P45984
9241	MAPK10	HGNC:6872; P53779
9242	MAPK11	HGNC:6873; Q15759
9243	MAPK12	HGNC:6874; P53778
9244	MAPK13	HGNC:6875; O15264
9245	MAPK14	HGNC:6876; Q16539
9246	MAPK15	HGNC:24667; Q8TD08
9247	MAPKAP1	HGNC:18752; Q9BPZ7
9248	MAPKAPK2	HGNC:6887; P49137
9249	MAPKAPK3	HGNC:6888; Q16644
9250	MAPKAPK5	HGNC:6889; Q8IW41
9251	MAPKBP1	HGNC:29536; O60336
9252	MAPRE1	HGNC:6890; Q15691
9253	MAPRE2	HGNC:6891; Q15555
9254	MAPRE3	HGNC:6892; Q9UPY8
9255	MAPT	HGNC:6893; P10636
9256	MARCHF1	HGNC:26077; Q8TCQ1
9257	MARCHF2	HGNC:28038; Q9P0N8
9258	MARCHF3	HGNC:28728; Q86UD3
9259	MARCHF4	HGNC:29269; Q9P2E8
9260	MARCHF5	HGNC:26025; Q9NX47
9261	MARCHF6	HGNC:30550; O60337
9262	MARCHF7	HGNC:17393; Q9H992
9263	MARCHF8	HGNC:23356; Q5T0T0
9264	MARCHF9	HGNC:25139; Q86YJ5
9265	MARCHF10	HGNC:26655; Q8NA82
9266	MARCHF11	HGNC:33609; A6NNE9
9267	MARCKS	HGNC:6759; P29966
9268	MARCKSL1	HGNC:7142; P49006
9269	MARCO	HGNC:6895; Q9UEW3
9270	MARCOL	HGNC:53644; A0A1B0GUY1
9271	MARF1	HGNC:29562; Q9Y4F3
9272	MARK1	HGNC:6896; Q9P0L2
9273	MARK2	HGNC:3332; Q7KZI7
9274	MARK3	HGNC:6897; P27448
9275	MARK4	HGNC:13538; Q96L34
9276	MARS1	HGNC:6898; P56192
9277	MARS2	HGNC:25133; Q96GW9
9278	MARVELD1	HGNC:28674; Q9BSK0
9279	MARVELD2	HGNC:26401; Q8N4S9
9280	MARVELD3	HGNC:30525; Q96A59
9281	MAS1	HGNC:6899; P04201
9282	MAS1L	HGNC:13961; P35410
9283	MASP1	HGNC:6901; P48740
9284	MASP2	HGNC:6902; O00187
9285	MAST1	HGNC:19034; Q9Y2H9
9286	MAST2	HGNC:19035; Q6P0Q8
9287	MAST3	HGNC:19036; O60307
9288	MAST4	HGNC:19037; O15021
9289	MASTL	HGNC:19042; Q96GX5
9290	MAT1A	HGNC:6903; Q00266
9291	MAT2A	HGNC:6904; P31153
9292	MAT2B	HGNC:6905; Q9NZL9
9293	MATCAP1	HGNC:34408; Q68EN5
9294	MATCAP2	HGNC:22206; Q8NCT3
9295	MATK	HGNC:6906; P42679
9296	MATN1	HGNC:6907; P21941
9297	MATN2	HGNC:6908; O00339
9298	MATN3	HGNC:6909; O15232
9299	MATN4	HGNC:6910; O95460
9300	MATR3	HGNC:6912; P43243
9301	MAU2	HGNC:29140; Q9Y6X3
9302	MAVS	HGNC:29233; Q7Z434
9303	MAX	HGNC:6913; P61244
9304	MAZ	HGNC:6914; P56270
9305	MB	HGNC:6915; P02144
9306	MB21D2	HGNC:30438; Q8IYB1
9307	MBD1	HGNC:6916; Q9UIS9
9308	MBD2	HGNC:6917; Q9UBB5
9309	MBD3	HGNC:6918; O95983
9310	MBD3L1	HGNC:15774; Q8WWY6
9311	MBD3L2	HGNC:18532; Q8NHZ7
9312	MBD3L2B	HGNC:53435; A0A1B0GVZ6
9313	MBD3L3	HGNC:37205; A6NE82
9314	MBD3L4	HGNC:37206; A6NDZ8
9315	MBD3L5	HGNC:37204; A6NJ08
9316	MBD4	HGNC:6919; O95243
9317	MBD5	HGNC:20444; Q9P267
9318	MBD6	HGNC:20445; Q96DN6
9319	MBIP	HGNC:20427; Q9NS73
9320	MBL2	HGNC:6922; P11226
9321	MBLAC1	HGNC:22180; A4D2B0
9322	MBLAC2	HGNC:33711; Q68D91
9323	MBNL1	HGNC:6923; Q9NR56
9324	MBNL2	HGNC:16746; Q5VZF2
9325	MBNL3	HGNC:20564; Q9NUK0
9326	MBOAT1	HGNC:21579; Q6ZNC8
9327	MBOAT2	HGNC:25193; Q6ZWT7
9328	MBOAT4	HGNC:32311; Q96T53
9329	MBOAT7	HGNC:15505; Q96N66
9330	MBP	HGNC:6925; P02686
9331	MBTD1	HGNC:19866; Q05BQ5
9332	MBTPS1	HGNC:15456; Q14703
9333	MBTPS2	HGNC:15455; O43462
9334	MC1R	HGNC:6929; Q01726
9335	MC2R	HGNC:6930; Q01718
9336	MC3R	HGNC:6931; P41968
9337	MC4R	HGNC:6932; P32245
9338	MC5R	HGNC:6933; P33032
9339	MCAM	HGNC:6934; P43121
9340	MCAT	HGNC:29622; Q8IVS2
9341	MCC	HGNC:6935; P23508
9342	MCCC1	HGNC:6936; Q96RQ3
9343	MCCC2	HGNC:6937; Q9HCC0
9344	MCCD1	HGNC:20668; P59942
9345	MCEE	HGNC:16732; Q96PE7
9346	MCEMP1	HGNC:27291; Q8IX19
9347	MCF2	HGNC:6940; P10911
9348	MCF2L	HGNC:14576; O15068
9349	MCF2L2	HGNC:30319; Q86YR7
9350	MCFD2	HGNC:18451; Q8NI22
9351	MCHR1	HGNC:4479; Q99705
9352	MCHR2	HGNC:20867; Q969V1
9353	MCIDAS	HGNC:40050; D6RGH6
9354	MCL1	HGNC:6943; Q07820
9355	MCM2	HGNC:6944; P49736
9356	MCM3	HGNC:6945; P25205
9357	MCM3AP	HGNC:6946; O60318
9358	MCM4	HGNC:6947; P33991
9359	MCM5	HGNC:6948; P33992
9360	MCM6	HGNC:6949; Q14566
9361	MCM7	HGNC:6950; P33993
9362	MCM8	HGNC:16147; Q9UJA3
9363	MCM9	HGNC:21484; Q9NXL9
9364	MCM10	HGNC:18043; Q7L590
9365	MCMBP	HGNC:25782; Q9BTE3
9366	MCMDC2	HGNC:26368; Q4G0Z9
9367	MCOLN1	HGNC:13356; Q9GZU1
9368	MCOLN2	HGNC:13357; Q8IZK6
9369	MCOLN3	HGNC:13358; Q8TDD5
9370	MCPH1	HGNC:6954; Q8NEM0
9371	MCRIP1	HGNC:28007; C9JLW8
9372	MCRIP2	HGNC:14142; Q9BUT9
9373	MCRS1	HGNC:6960; Q96EZ8
9374	MCTP1	HGNC:26183; Q6DN14
9375	MCTP2	HGNC:25636; Q6DN12
9376	MCTS1	HGNC:23357; Q9ULC4
9377	MCTS2	HGNC:49760; A0A3B3IRV3
9378	MCU	HGNC:23526; Q8NE86
9379	MCUB	HGNC:26076; Q9NWR8
9380	MCUR1	HGNC:21097; Q96AQ8
9381	MDC1	HGNC:21163; Q14676
9382	MDFI	HGNC:6967; Q99750
9383	MDFIC	HGNC:28870; Q9P1T7
9384	MDFIC2	HGNC:53442; A0A1B0GVS7
9385	MDGA1	HGNC:19267; Q8NFP4
9386	MDGA2	HGNC:19835; Q7Z553
9387	MDH1	HGNC:6970; P40925
9388	MDH1B	HGNC:17836; Q5I0G3
9389	MDH2	HGNC:6971; P40926
9390	MDK	HGNC:6972; P21741
9391	MDM1	HGNC:29917; Q8TC05
9392	MDM2	HGNC:6973; Q00987
9393	MDM4	HGNC:6974; O15151
9394	MDN1	HGNC:18302; Q9NU22
9395	MDP1	HGNC:28781; Q86V88
9396	ME1	HGNC:6983; P48163
9397	ME2	HGNC:6984; P23368
9398	ME3	HGNC:6985; Q16798
9399	MEA1	HGNC:6986; Q16626
9400	MEAF6	HGNC:25674; Q9HAF1
9401	MEAK7	HGNC:29325; Q6P9B6
9402	MECOM	HGNC:3498; Q03112
9403	MECP2	HGNC:6990; P51608
9404	MECR	HGNC:19691; Q9BV79
9405	MED1	HGNC:9234; Q15648
9406	MED4	HGNC:17903; Q9NPJ6
9407	MED6	HGNC:19970; O75586
9408	MED7	HGNC:2378; O43513
9409	MED8	HGNC:19971; Q96G25
9410	MED9	HGNC:25487; Q9NWA0
9411	MED10	HGNC:28760; Q9BTT4
9412	MED11	HGNC:32687; Q9P086
9413	MED12	HGNC:11957; Q93074
9414	MED12L	HGNC:16050; Q86YW9
9415	MED13	HGNC:22474; Q9UHV7
9416	MED13L	HGNC:22962; Q71F56
9417	MED14	HGNC:2370; O60244
9418	MED14OS	HGNC:40162; P0DP75
9419	MED15	HGNC:14248; Q96RN5
9420	MED16	HGNC:17556; Q9Y2X0
9421	MED17	HGNC:2375; Q9NVC6
9422	MED18	HGNC:25944; Q9BUE0
9423	MED19	HGNC:29600; A0JLT2
9424	MED20	HGNC:16840; Q9H944
9425	MED21	HGNC:11473; Q13503
9426	MED22	HGNC:11477; Q15528
9427	MED23	HGNC:2372; Q9ULK4
9428	MED24	HGNC:22963; O75448
9429	MED25	HGNC:28845; Q71SY5
9430	MED26	HGNC:2376; O95402
9431	MED27	HGNC:2377; Q6P2C8
9432	MED28	HGNC:24628; Q9H204
9433	MED29	HGNC:23074; Q9NX70
9434	MED30	HGNC:23032; Q96HR3
9435	MED31	HGNC:24260; Q9Y3C7
9436	MEDAG	HGNC:25926; Q5VYS4
9437	MEF2A	HGNC:6993; Q02078
9438	MEF2B	HGNC:6995; Q02080
9439	MEF2C	HGNC:6996; Q06413
9440	MEF2D	HGNC:6997; Q14814
9441	MEFV	HGNC:6998; O15553
9442	MEGF6	HGNC:3232; O75095
9443	MEGF8	HGNC:3233; Q7Z7M0
9444	MEGF9	HGNC:3234; Q9H1U4
9445	MEGF10	HGNC:29634; Q96KG7
9446	MEGF11	HGNC:29635; A6BM72
9447	MEI1	HGNC:28613; Q5TIA1
9448	MEI4	HGNC:43638; A8MW99
9449	MEIG1	HGNC:23429; Q5JSS6
9450	MEIKIN	HGNC:51253; A0A087WXM9
9451	MEIOB	HGNC:28569; Q8N635
9452	MEIOC	HGNC:26670; A2RUB1
9453	MEIOSIN	HGNC:44318; C9JSJ3
9454	MEIS1	HGNC:7000; O00470
9455	MEIS2	HGNC:7001; O14770
9456	MEIS3	HGNC:29537; Q99687
9457	MELK	HGNC:16870; Q14680
9458	MELTF	HGNC:7037; P08582
9459	MEMO1	HGNC:14014; Q9Y316
9460	MEN1	HGNC:7010; O00255
9461	MEOX1	HGNC:7013; P50221
9462	MEOX2	HGNC:7014; P50222
9463	MEP1A	HGNC:7015; Q16819
9464	MEP1B	HGNC:7020; Q16820
9465	MEPCE	HGNC:20247; Q7L2J0
9466	MEPE	HGNC:13361; Q9NQ76
9467	MERTK	HGNC:7027; Q12866
9468	MESD	HGNC:13520; Q14696
9469	MESP1	HGNC:29658; Q9BRJ9
9470	MESP2	HGNC:29659; Q0VG99
9471	MEST	HGNC:7028; Q5EB52
9472	MET	HGNC:7029; P08581
9473	METAP1	HGNC:15789; P53582
9474	METAP1D	HGNC:32583; Q6UB28
9475	METAP2	HGNC:16672; P50579
9476	METRN	HGNC:14151; Q9UJH8
9477	METRNL	HGNC:27584; Q641Q3
9478	METTL1	HGNC:7030; Q9UBP6
9479	METTL2A	HGNC:25755; Q96IZ6
9480	METTL2B	HGNC:18272; Q6P1Q9
9481	METTL3	HGNC:17563; Q86U44
9482	METTL4	HGNC:24726; Q8N3J2
9483	METTL5	HGNC:25006; Q9NRN9
9484	METTL6	HGNC:28343; Q8TCB7
9485	METTL8	HGNC:25856; Q9H825
9486	METTL9	HGNC:24586; Q9H1A3
9487	METTL13	HGNC:24248; Q8N6R0
9488	METTL14	HGNC:29330; Q9HCE5
9489	METTL15	HGNC:26606; A6NJ78
9490	METTL16	HGNC:28484; Q86W50
9491	METTL17	HGNC:19280; Q9H7H0
9492	METTL18	HGNC:28793; O95568
9493	METTL21A	HGNC:30476; Q8WXB1
9494	METTL21C	HGNC:33717; Q5VZV1
9495	METTL22	HGNC:28368; Q9BUU2
9496	METTL23	HGNC:26988; Q86XA0
9497	METTL24	HGNC:21566; Q5JXM2
9498	METTL25	HGNC:26228; Q8N6Q8
9499	METTL25B	HGNC:24273; Q96FB5
9500	METTL26	HGNC:14141; Q96S19
9501	METTL27	HGNC:19068; Q8N6F8
9502	MEX3A	HGNC:33482; A1L020
9503	MEX3B	HGNC:25297; Q6ZN04
9504	MEX3C	HGNC:28040; Q5U5Q3
9505	MEX3D	HGNC:16734; Q86XN8
9506	MFAP1	HGNC:7032; P55081
9507	MFAP2	HGNC:7033; P55001
9508	MFAP3	HGNC:7034; P55082
9509	MFAP3L	HGNC:29083; O75121
9510	MFAP4	HGNC:7035; P55083
9511	MFAP5	HGNC:29673; Q13361
9512	MFF	HGNC:24858; Q9GZY8
9513	MFGE8	HGNC:7036; Q08431
9514	MFHAS1	HGNC:16982; Q9Y4C4
9515	MFN1	HGNC:18262; Q8IWA4
9516	MFN2	HGNC:16877; O95140
9517	MFNG	HGNC:7038; O00587
9518	MFRP	HGNC:18121; Q9BY79
9519	MFSD1	HGNC:25874; Q9H3U5
9520	MFSD2A	HGNC:25897; Q8NA29
9521	MFSD2B	HGNC:37207; A6NFX1
9522	MFSD6	HGNC:24711; Q6ZSS7
9523	MFSD6L	HGNC:26656; Q8IWD5
9524	MFSD8	HGNC:28486; Q8NHS3
9525	MFSD11	HGNC:25458; O43934
9526	MFSD12	HGNC:28299; Q6NUT3
9527	MGA	HGNC:14010; Q8IWI9
9528	MGAM	HGNC:7043; O43451
9529	MGAM2	HGNC:28101; Q2M2H8
9530	MGARP	HGNC:29969; Q8TDB4
9531	MGAT1	HGNC:7044; P26572
9532	MGAT2	HGNC:7045; Q10469
9533	MGAT3	HGNC:7046; Q09327
9534	MGAT4A	HGNC:7047; Q9UM21
9535	MGAT4B	HGNC:7048; Q9UQ53
9536	MGAT4C	HGNC:30871; Q9UBM8
9537	MGAT4D	HGNC:43619; A6NG13
9538	MGAT5	HGNC:7049; Q09328
9539	MGAT5B	HGNC:24140; Q3V5L5
9540	MGLL	HGNC:17038; Q99685
9541	MGME1	HGNC:16205; Q9BQP7
9542	MGMT	HGNC:7059; P16455
9543	MGP	HGNC:7060; P08493
9544	MGRN1	HGNC:20254; O60291
9545	MGST1	HGNC:7061; P10620
9546	MGST2	HGNC:7063; Q99735
9547	MGST3	HGNC:7064; O14880
9548	MIA	HGNC:7076; Q16674
9549	MIA2	HGNC:18432; Q96PC5
9550	MIA3	HGNC:24008; Q5JRA6
9551	MIB1	HGNC:21086; Q86YT6
9552	MIB2	HGNC:30577; Q96AX9
9553	MICA	HGNC:7090; Q29983
9554	MICAL1	HGNC:20619; Q8TDZ2
9555	MICAL2	HGNC:24693; O94851
9556	MICAL3	HGNC:24694; Q7RTP6
9557	MICALL1	HGNC:29804; Q8N3F8
9558	MICALL2	HGNC:29672; Q8IY33
9559	MICB	HGNC:7091; Q29980
9560	MICOS10	HGNC:32068; Q5TGZ0
9561	MICOS13	HGNC:33702; Q5XKP0
9562	MICU1	HGNC:1530; Q9BPX6
9563	MICU2	HGNC:31830; Q8IYU8
9564	MICU3	HGNC:27820; Q86XE3
9565	MID1	HGNC:7095; O15344
9566	MID1IP1	HGNC:20715; Q9NPA3
9567	MID2	HGNC:7096; Q9UJV3
9568	MIDEAS	HGNC:19853; Q6PJG2
9569	MIDN	HGNC:16298; Q504T8
9570	MIEF1	HGNC:25979; L0R8F8, Q9NQG6
9571	MIEF2	HGNC:17920; Q96C03
9572	MIEN1	HGNC:28230; Q9BRT3
9573	MIER1	HGNC:29657; Q8N108
9574	MIER2	HGNC:29210; Q8N344
9575	MIER3	HGNC:26678; Q7Z3K6
9576	MIF	HGNC:7097; P14174
9577	MIF4GD	HGNC:24030; A9UHW6
9578	MIGA1	HGNC:24741; Q8NAN2
9579	MIGA2	HGNC:23621; Q7L4E1
9580	MIIP	HGNC:25715; Q5JXC2
9581	MILR1	HGNC:27570; Q7Z6M3
9582	MINAR1	HGNC:29172; Q9UPX6
9583	MINAR2	HGNC:33914; P59773
9584	MINDY1	HGNC:25648; Q8N5J2
9585	MINDY2	HGNC:26954; Q8NBR6
9586	MINDY3	HGNC:23578; Q9H8M7
9587	MINDY4	HGNC:21916; Q4G0A6
9588	MINDY4B	HGNC:35475; A8MYZ0
9589	MINK1	HGNC:17565; Q8N4C8
9590	MINPP1	HGNC:7102; Q9UNW1
9591	MIOS	HGNC:21905; Q9NXC5
9592	MIOX	HGNC:14522; Q9UGB7
9593	MIP	HGNC:7103; P30301
9594	MIPEP	HGNC:7104; Q99797
9595	MIPOL1	HGNC:21460; Q8TD10
9596	MIS12	HGNC:24967; Q9H081
9597	MIS18A	HGNC:1286; Q9NYP9
9598	MIS18BP1	HGNC:20190; Q6P0N0
9599	MISFA	HGNC:44122; A0A0U1RRN3
9600	MISP	HGNC:27000; Q8IVT2
9601	MISP3	HGNC:26963; Q96FF7
9602	MITD1	HGNC:25207; Q8WV92
9603	MITF	HGNC:7105; O75030
9604	MIX23	HGNC:31136; Q4VC31
9605	MIXL1	HGNC:13363; Q9H2W2
9606	MKI67	HGNC:7107; P46013
9607	MKKS	HGNC:7108; Q9NPJ1
9608	MKLN1	HGNC:7109; Q9UL63
9609	MKNK1	HGNC:7110; Q9BUB5
9610	MKNK2	HGNC:7111; Q9HBH9
9611	MKRN1	HGNC:7112; Q9UHC7
9612	MKRN2	HGNC:7113; Q9H000
9613	MKRN2OS	HGNC:40375; H3BPM6
9614	MKRN3	HGNC:7114; Q13064
9615	MKS1	HGNC:7121; Q9NXB0
9616	MKX	HGNC:23729; Q8IYA7
9617	MLANA	HGNC:7124; Q16655
9618	MLC1	HGNC:17082; Q15049
9619	MLDHR	HGNC:55481; C0HLV8
9620	MLEC	HGNC:28973; Q14165
9621	MLF1	HGNC:7125; P58340
9622	MLF2	HGNC:7126; Q15773
9623	MLH1	HGNC:7127; P40692
9624	MLH3	HGNC:7128; Q9UHC1
9625	MLIP	HGNC:21355; Q5VWP3
9626	MLKL	HGNC:26617; Q8NB16
9627	MLLT1	HGNC:7134; Q03111
9628	MLLT3	HGNC:7136; P42568
9629	MLLT6	HGNC:7138; P55198
9630	MLLT10	HGNC:16063; P55197
9631	MLLT11	HGNC:16997; Q13015
9632	MLN	HGNC:7141; P12872
9633	MLNR	HGNC:4495; O43193
9634	MLPH	HGNC:29643; Q9BV36
9635	MLST8	HGNC:24825; Q9BVC4
9636	MLX	HGNC:11645; Q9UH92
9637	MLXIP	HGNC:17055; Q9HAP2
9638	MLXIPL	HGNC:12744; Q9NP71
9639	MLYCD	HGNC:7150; O95822
9640	MMAA	HGNC:18871; Q8IVH4
9641	MMAB	HGNC:19331; Q96EY8
9642	MMACHC	HGNC:24525; Q9Y4U1
9643	MMADHC	HGNC:25221; Q9H3L0
9644	MMD	HGNC:7153; Q15546
9645	MMD2	HGNC:30133; Q8IY49
9646	MME	HGNC:7154; P08473
9647	MMEL1	HGNC:14668; Q495T6
9648	MMGT1	HGNC:28100; Q8N4V1
9649	MMP1	HGNC:7155; P03956
9650	MMP2	HGNC:7166; P08253
9651	MMP3	HGNC:7173; P08254
9652	MMP7	HGNC:7174; P09237
9653	MMP8	HGNC:7175; P22894
9654	MMP9	HGNC:7176; P14780
9655	MMP10	HGNC:7156; P09238
9656	MMP11	HGNC:7157; P24347
9657	MMP12	HGNC:7158; P39900
9658	MMP13	HGNC:7159; P45452
9659	MMP14	HGNC:7160; P50281
9660	MMP15	HGNC:7161; P51511
9661	MMP16	HGNC:7162; P51512
9662	MMP17	HGNC:7163; Q9ULZ9
9663	MMP19	HGNC:7165; Q99542
9664	MMP20	HGNC:7167; O60882
9665	MMP21	HGNC:14357; Q8N119
9666	MMP23B	HGNC:7171; O75900
9667	MMP24	HGNC:7172; Q9Y5R2
9668	MMP24OS	HGNC:44421; A0A0U1RRL7
9669	MMP25	HGNC:14246; Q9NPA2
9670	MMP26	HGNC:14249; Q9NRE1
9671	MMP27	HGNC:14250; Q9H306
9672	MMP28	HGNC:14366; Q9H239
9673	MMRN1	HGNC:7178; Q13201
9674	MMRN2	HGNC:19888; Q9H8L6
9675	MMS19	HGNC:13824; Q96T76
9676	MMS22L	HGNC:21475; Q6ZRQ5
9677	MMUT	HGNC:7526; P22033
9678	MN1	HGNC:7180; Q10571
9679	MNAT1	HGNC:7181; P51948
9680	MND1	HGNC:24839; Q9BWT6
9681	MNDA	HGNC:7183; P41218
9682	MNS1	HGNC:29636; Q8NEH6
9683	MNT	HGNC:7188; Q99583
9684	MNX1	HGNC:4979; P50219
9685	MOAP1	HGNC:16658; Q96BY2
9686	MOB1A	HGNC:16015; Q9H8S9
9687	MOB1B	HGNC:29801; Q7L9L4
9688	MOB2	HGNC:24904; Q70IA6
9689	MOB3A	HGNC:29802; Q96BX8
9690	MOB3B	HGNC:23825; Q86TA1
9691	MOB3C	HGNC:29800; Q70IA8
9692	MOB4	HGNC:17261; Q9Y3A3
9693	MOBP	HGNC:7189; Q13875
9694	MOCOS	HGNC:18234; Q96EN8
9695	MOCS1	HGNC:7190; Q9NZB8
9696	MOCS2	HGNC:7193; O96007, O96033
9697	MOCS3	HGNC:15765; O95396
9698	MOG	HGNC:7197; Q16653
9699	MOGAT1	HGNC:18210; Q96PD6
9700	MOGAT2	HGNC:23248; Q3SYC2
9701	MOGAT3	HGNC:23249; Q86VF5
9702	MOGS	HGNC:24862; Q13724
9703	MOK	HGNC:9833; Q9UQ07
9704	MON1A	HGNC:28207; Q86VX9
9705	MON1B	HGNC:25020; Q7L1V2
9706	MON2	HGNC:29177; Q7Z3U7
9707	MORC1	HGNC:7198; Q86VD1
9708	MORC2	HGNC:23573; Q9Y6X9
9709	MORC3	HGNC:23572; Q14149
9710	MORC4	HGNC:23485; Q8TE76
9711	MORF4L1	HGNC:16989; Q9UBU8
9712	MORF4L2	HGNC:16849; Q15014
9713	MORN1	HGNC:25852; Q5T089
9714	MORN2	HGNC:30166; Q502X0
9715	MORN3	HGNC:29807; Q6PF18
9716	MORN4	HGNC:24001; Q8NDC4
9717	MORN5	HGNC:17841; Q5VZ52
9718	MOS	HGNC:7199; P00540
9719	MOSMO	HGNC:27087; Q8NHV5
9720	MOSPD1	HGNC:25235; Q9UJG1
9721	MOSPD2	HGNC:28381; Q8NHP6
9722	MOSPD3	HGNC:25078; O75425
9723	MOV10	HGNC:7200; Q9HCE1
9724	MOV10L1	HGNC:7201; Q9BXT6
9725	MOXD1	HGNC:21063; Q6UVY6
9726	MPC1	HGNC:21606; Q9Y5U8
9727	MPC1L	HGNC:44205; P0DKB6
9728	MPC2	HGNC:24515; O95563
9729	MPDU1	HGNC:7207; O75352
9730	MPDZ	HGNC:7208; O75970
9731	MPEG1	HGNC:29619; Q2M385
9732	MPG	HGNC:7211; P29372
9733	MPHOSPH6	HGNC:7214; Q99547
9734	MPHOSPH8	HGNC:29810; Q99549
9735	MPHOSPH9	HGNC:7215; Q99550
9736	MPHOSPH10	HGNC:7213; O00566
9737	MPI	HGNC:7216; P34949
9738	MPIG6B	HGNC:13937; O95866
9739	MPL	HGNC:7217; P40238
9740	MPLKIP	HGNC:16002; Q8TAP9
9741	MPND	HGNC:25934; Q8N594
9742	MPO	HGNC:7218; P05164
9743	MPP1	HGNC:7219; Q00013
9744	MPP2	HGNC:7220; Q14168
9745	MPP3	HGNC:7221; Q13368
9746	MPP4	HGNC:13680; Q96JB8
9747	MPP7	HGNC:26542; Q5T2T1
9748	MPPE1	HGNC:15988; Q53F39
9749	MPPED1	HGNC:1306; O15442
9750	MPPED2	HGNC:1180; Q15777
9751	MPRIP	HGNC:30321; Q6WCQ1
9752	MPST	HGNC:7223; P25325
9753	MPV17	HGNC:7224; P39210
9754	MPV17L	HGNC:26827; Q2QL34
9755	MPV17L2	HGNC:28177; Q567V2
9756	MPZ	HGNC:7225; P25189
9757	MPZL1	HGNC:7226; O95297
9758	MPZL2	HGNC:3496; O60487
9759	MPZL3	HGNC:27279; Q6UWV2
9760	MR1	HGNC:4975; Q95460
9761	MRAP	HGNC:1304; Q8TCY5
9762	MRAP2	HGNC:21232; Q96G30
9763	MRAS	HGNC:7227; O14807
9764	MRC1	HGNC:7228; P22897
9765	MRC2	HGNC:16875; Q9UBG0
9766	MRE11	HGNC:7230; P49959
9767	MREG	HGNC:25478; Q8N565
9768	MRFAP1	HGNC:24549; Q9Y605
9769	MRFAP1L1	HGNC:28796; Q96HT8
9770	MRFAP1L2	HGNC:25109; B2RBV5
9771	MRGBP	HGNC:15866; Q9NV56
9772	MRGPRD	HGNC:29626; Q8TDS7
9773	MRGPRE	HGNC:30694; Q86SM8
9774	MRGPRF	HGNC:24828; Q96AM1
9775	MRGPRG	HGNC:24829; Q86SM5
9776	MRGPRX1	HGNC:17962; Q96LB2
9777	MRGPRX2	HGNC:17983; Q96LB1
9778	MRGPRX3	HGNC:17980; Q96LB0
9779	MRGPRX4	HGNC:17617; Q96LA9
9780	MRI1	HGNC:28469; Q9BV20
9781	MRLN	HGNC:48649; P0DMT0
9782	MRM1	HGNC:26202; Q6IN84
9783	MRM2	HGNC:16352; Q9UI43
9784	MRM3	HGNC:18485; Q9HC36
9785	MRNIP	HGNC:30817; Q6NTE8
9786	MRO	HGNC:24121; Q9BYG7
9787	MROH1	HGNC:26958; Q8NDA8
9788	MROH2A	HGNC:27936; A6NES4
9789	MROH2B	HGNC:26857; Q7Z745
9790	MROH5	HGNC:42976; Q6ZUA9
9791	MROH6	HGNC:27814; A6NGR9
9792	MROH7	HGNC:24802; Q68CQ1
9793	MROH8	HGNC:16125; Q9H579
9794	MROH9	HGNC:26287; Q5TGP6
9795	MRPL1	HGNC:14275; Q9BYD6
9796	MRPL2	HGNC:14056; Q5T653
9797	MRPL3	HGNC:10379; P09001
9798	MRPL4	HGNC:14276; Q9BYD3
9799	MRPL9	HGNC:14277; Q9BYD2
9800	MRPL10	HGNC:14055; Q7Z7H8
9801	MRPL11	HGNC:14042; Q9Y3B7
9802	MRPL12	HGNC:10378; P52815
9803	MRPL13	HGNC:14278; Q9BYD1
9804	MRPL14	HGNC:14279; Q6P1L8
9805	MRPL15	HGNC:14054; Q9P015
9806	MRPL16	HGNC:14476; Q9NX20
9807	MRPL17	HGNC:14053; Q9NRX2
9808	MRPL18	HGNC:14477; Q9H0U6
9809	MRPL19	HGNC:14052; P49406
9810	MRPL20	HGNC:14478; Q9BYC9
9811	MRPL21	HGNC:14479; Q7Z2W9
9812	MRPL22	HGNC:14480; Q9NWU5
9813	MRPL23	HGNC:10322; Q16540
9814	MRPL24	HGNC:14037; Q96A35
9815	MRPL27	HGNC:14483; Q9P0M9
9816	MRPL28	HGNC:14484; Q13084
9817	MRPL30	HGNC:14036; Q8TCC3
9818	MRPL32	HGNC:14035; Q9BYC8
9819	MRPL33	HGNC:14487; O75394
9820	MRPL34	HGNC:14488; Q9BQ48
9821	MRPL35	HGNC:14489; Q9NZE8
9822	MRPL36	HGNC:14490; Q9P0J6
9823	MRPL37	HGNC:14034; Q9BZE1
9824	MRPL38	HGNC:14033; Q96DV4
9825	MRPL39	HGNC:14027; Q9NYK5
9826	MRPL40	HGNC:14491; Q9NQ50
9827	MRPL41	HGNC:14492; Q8IXM3
9828	MRPL42	HGNC:14493; Q9Y6G3
9829	MRPL43	HGNC:14517; Q8N983
9830	MRPL44	HGNC:16650; Q9H9J2
9831	MRPL45	HGNC:16651; Q9BRJ2
9832	MRPL46	HGNC:1192; Q9H2W6
9833	MRPL47	HGNC:16652; Q9HD33
9834	MRPL48	HGNC:16653; Q96GC5
9835	MRPL49	HGNC:1176; Q13405
9836	MRPL50	HGNC:16654; Q8N5N7
9837	MRPL51	HGNC:14044; Q4U2R6
9838	MRPL52	HGNC:16655; Q86TS9
9839	MRPL53	HGNC:16684; Q96EL3
9840	MRPL54	HGNC:16685; Q6P161
9841	MRPL55	HGNC:16686; Q7Z7F7
9842	MRPL57	HGNC:14514; Q9BQC6
9843	MRPL58	HGNC:5359; Q14197
9844	MRPS2	HGNC:14495; Q9Y399
9845	MRPS5	HGNC:14498; P82675
9846	MRPS6	HGNC:14051; P82932
9847	MRPS7	HGNC:14499; Q9Y2R9
9848	MRPS9	HGNC:14501; P82933
9849	MRPS10	HGNC:14502; P82664
9850	MRPS11	HGNC:14050; P82912
9851	MRPS12	HGNC:10380; O15235
9852	MRPS14	HGNC:14049; O60783
9853	MRPS15	HGNC:14504; P82914
9854	MRPS16	HGNC:14048; Q9Y3D3
9855	MRPS17	HGNC:14047; Q9Y2R5
9856	MRPS18A	HGNC:14515; Q9NVS2
9857	MRPS18B	HGNC:14516; Q9Y676
9858	MRPS18C	HGNC:16633; Q9Y3D5
9859	MRPS21	HGNC:14046; P82921
9860	MRPS22	HGNC:14508; P82650
9861	MRPS23	HGNC:14509; Q9Y3D9
9862	MRPS24	HGNC:14510; Q96EL2
9863	MRPS25	HGNC:14511; P82663
9864	MRPS26	HGNC:14045; Q9BYN8
9865	MRPS27	HGNC:14512; Q92552
9866	MRPS28	HGNC:14513; Q9Y2Q9
9867	MRPS30	HGNC:8769; Q9NP92
9868	MRPS31	HGNC:16632; Q92665
9869	MRPS33	HGNC:16634; Q9Y291
9870	MRPS34	HGNC:16618; P82930
9871	MRPS35	HGNC:16635; P82673
9872	MRRF	HGNC:7234; Q96E11
9873	MRS2	HGNC:13785; Q9HD23
9874	MRTFA	HGNC:14334; Q969V6
9875	MRTFB	HGNC:29819; Q9ULH7
9876	MRTO4	HGNC:18477; Q9UKD2
9877	MS4A1	HGNC:7315; P11836
9878	MS4A2	HGNC:7316; Q01362
9879	MS4A3	HGNC:7317; Q96HJ5
9880	MS4A4A	HGNC:13371; Q96JQ5
9881	MS4A4E	HGNC:14284; Q96PG1
9882	MS4A5	HGNC:13374; Q9H3V2
9883	MS4A6A	HGNC:13375; Q9H2W1
9884	MS4A6E	HGNC:14285; Q96DS6
9885	MS4A7	HGNC:13378; Q9GZW8
9886	MS4A8	HGNC:13380; Q9BY19
9887	MS4A10	HGNC:13368; Q96PG2
9888	MS4A12	HGNC:13370; Q9NXJ0
9889	MS4A13	HGNC:16674; Q5J8X5
9890	MS4A14	HGNC:30706; Q96JA4
9891	MS4A15	HGNC:28573; Q8N5U1
9892	MS4A18	HGNC:37636; Q3C1V0
9893	MSANTD1	HGNC:33741; Q6ZTZ1
9894	MSANTD2	HGNC:26266; Q6P1R3
9895	MSANTD3	HGNC:23370; Q96H12
9896	MSANTD4	HGNC:29383; Q8NCY6
9897	MSANTD5	HGNC:55184; A0A3B3IT52
9898	MSANTD7	HGNC:56248; A0A1W2PQ72
9899	MSC	HGNC:7321; O60682
9900	MSGN1	HGNC:14907; A6NI15
9901	MSH2	HGNC:7325; P43246
9902	MSH3	HGNC:7326; P20585
9903	MSH4	HGNC:7327; O15457
9904	MSH5	HGNC:7328; O43196
9905	MSH6	HGNC:7329; P52701
9906	MSI1	HGNC:7330; O43347
9907	MSI2	HGNC:18585; Q96DH6
9908	MSL1	HGNC:27905; Q68DK7
9909	MSL2	HGNC:25544; Q9HCI7
9910	MSL3	HGNC:7370; Q8N5Y2
9911	MSL3B	HGNC:17837; P0C860
9912	MSLN	HGNC:7371; Q13421
9913	MSMB	HGNC:7372; P08118
9914	MSMO1	HGNC:10545; Q15800
9915	MSMP	HGNC:29663; Q1L6U9
9916	MSN	HGNC:7373; P26038
9917	MSR1	HGNC:7376; P21757
9918	MSRA	HGNC:7377; Q9UJ68
9919	MSRB1	HGNC:14133; Q9NZV6
9920	MSRB2	HGNC:17061; Q9Y3D2
9921	MSRB3	HGNC:27375; Q8IXL7
9922	MSS51	HGNC:21000; Q4VC12
9923	MST1	HGNC:7380; P26927
9924	MST1R	HGNC:7381; Q04912
9925	MSTN	HGNC:4223; O14793
9926	MSTO1	HGNC:29678; Q9BUK6
9927	MSX1	HGNC:7391; P28360
9928	MSX2	HGNC:7392; P35548
9929	MT1A	HGNC:7393; P04731
9930	MT1B	HGNC:7394; P07438
9931	MT1E	HGNC:7397; P04732
9932	MT1F	HGNC:7398; P04733
9933	MT1G	HGNC:7399; P13640
9934	MT1H	HGNC:7400; P80294
9935	MT1HL1	HGNC:31864; P0DM35
9936	MT1M	HGNC:14296; Q8N339
9937	MT1X	HGNC:7405; P80297
9938	MT2A	HGNC:7406; P02795
9939	MT3	HGNC:7408; P25713
9940	MT4	HGNC:18705; P47944
9941	MT-ATP6	HGNC:7414; P00846
9942	MT-ATP8	HGNC:7415; P03928
9943	MT-CO1	HGNC:7419; P00395
9944	MT-CO2	HGNC:7421; P00403
9945	MT-CO3	HGNC:7422; P00414
9946	MT-CYB	HGNC:7427; P00156
9947	MT-ND1	HGNC:7455; P03886
9948	MT-ND2	HGNC:7456; P03891
9949	MT-ND3	HGNC:7458; P03897
9950	MT-ND4	HGNC:7459; P03905
9951	MT-ND4L	HGNC:7460; P03901
9952	MT-ND5	HGNC:7461; P03915
9953	MT-ND6	HGNC:7462; P03923
9954	MTA1	HGNC:7410; Q13330
9955	MTA2	HGNC:7411; O94776
9956	MTA3	HGNC:23784; Q9BTC8
9957	MTAP	HGNC:7413; Q13126
9958	MTARC1	HGNC:26189; Q5VT66
9959	MTARC2	HGNC:26064; Q969Z3
9960	MTBP	HGNC:7417; Q96DY7
9961	MTCH1	HGNC:17586; Q9NZJ7
9962	MTCH2	HGNC:17587; Q9Y6C9
9963	MTCL1	HGNC:29121; Q9Y4B5
9964	MTCL2	HGNC:16111; O94964
9965	MTCL3	HGNC:21494; Q5TF21
9966	MTCP1	HGNC:7423; P56278
9967	MTDH	HGNC:29608; Q86UE4
9968	MTERF1	HGNC:21463; Q99551
9969	MTERF2	HGNC:30779; Q49AM1
9970	MTERF3	HGNC:24258; Q96E29
9971	MTERF4	HGNC:28785; Q7Z6M4
9972	MTF1	HGNC:7428; Q14872
9973	MTF2	HGNC:29535; Q9Y483
9974	MTFMT	HGNC:29666; Q96DP5
9975	MTFP1	HGNC:26945; Q9UDX5
9976	MTFR1	HGNC:29510; Q15390
9977	MTFR1L	HGNC:28836; Q9H019
9978	MTFR2	HGNC:21115; Q6P444
9979	MTG1	HGNC:32159; Q9BT17
9980	MTG2	HGNC:16239; Q9H4K7
9981	MTHFD1	HGNC:7432; P11586
9982	MTHFD1L	HGNC:21055; Q6UB35
9983	MTHFD2	HGNC:7434; P13995
9984	MTHFD2L	HGNC:31865; Q9H903
9985	MTHFR	HGNC:7436; P42898
9986	MTHFS	HGNC:7437; P49914
9987	MTHFSD	HGNC:25778; Q2M296
9988	MTIF2	HGNC:7441; P46199
9989	MTIF3	HGNC:29788; Q9H2K0
9990	MTLN	HGNC:27339; Q8NCU8
9991	MTM1	HGNC:7448; Q13496
9992	MTMR1	HGNC:7449; Q13613
9993	MTMR2	HGNC:7450; Q13614
9994	MTMR3	HGNC:7451; Q13615
9995	MTMR4	HGNC:7452; Q9NYA4
9996	MTMR6	HGNC:7453; Q9Y217
9997	MTMR7	HGNC:7454; Q9Y216
9998	MTMR8	HGNC:16825; Q96EF0
9999	MTMR9	HGNC:14596; Q96QG7
10000	MTMR10	HGNC:25999; Q9NXD2
10001	MTMR11	HGNC:24307; A4FU01
10002	MTMR12	HGNC:18191; Q9C0I1
10003	MTMR14	HGNC:26190; Q8NCE2
10004	MTNAP1	HGNC:29601; Q9BSJ5
10005	MTNR1A	HGNC:7463; P48039
10006	MTNR1B	HGNC:7464; P49286
10007	MTO1	HGNC:19261; Q9Y2Z2
10008	MTOR	HGNC:3942; P42345
10009	MTPAP	HGNC:25532; Q9NVV4
10010	MTPN	HGNC:15667; P58546
10011	MTR	HGNC:7468; Q99707
10012	MTRES1	HGNC:17971; Q9P0P8
10013	MTREX	HGNC:18734; P42285
10014	MTRF1	HGNC:7469; O75570
10015	MTRF1L	HGNC:21051; Q9UGC7
10016	MTRFR	HGNC:26784; Q9H3J6
10017	MTRR	HGNC:7473; Q9UBK8
10018	MTSS1	HGNC:20443; O43312
10019	MTSS2	HGNC:25094; Q765P7
10020	MTTP	HGNC:7467; P55157
10021	MTURN	HGNC:25457; Q8N3F0
10022	MTUS1	HGNC:29789; Q9ULD2
10023	MTUS2	HGNC:20595; Q5JR59
10024	MTX1	HGNC:7504; Q13505
10025	MTX2	HGNC:7506; O75431
10026	MTX3	HGNC:24812; Q5HYI7
10027	MUC1	HGNC:7508; P15941
10028	MUC2	HGNC:7512; Q02817
10029	MUC3A	HGNC:7513; Q02505
10030	MUC3B	HGNC:13384; Q9H195
10031	MUC4	HGNC:7514; Q99102
10032	MUC5AC	HGNC:7515; P98088
10033	MUC5B	HGNC:7516; Q9HC84
10034	MUC6	HGNC:7517; Q6W4X9
10035	MUC7	HGNC:7518; Q8TAX7
10036	MUC8	HGNC:7519
10037	MUC12	HGNC:7510; Q9UKN1
10038	MUC13	HGNC:7511; Q9H3R2
10039	MUC15	HGNC:14956; Q8N387
10040	MUC16	HGNC:15582; Q8WXI7
10041	MUC17	HGNC:16800; Q685J3
10042	MUC19	HGNC:14362; Q7Z5P9
10043	MUC20	HGNC:23282; Q8N307
10044	MUC21	HGNC:21661; Q5SSG8
10045	MUC22	HGNC:39755; E2RYF6
10046	MUCL1	HGNC:30588; Q96DR8
10047	MUCL3	HGNC:21666; Q3MIW9
10048	MUL1	HGNC:25762; Q969V5
10049	MUS81	HGNC:29814; Q96NY9
10050	MUSK	HGNC:7525; O15146
10051	MUSTN1	HGNC:22144; Q8IVN3
10052	MUTYH	HGNC:7527; Q9UIF7
10053	MVB12A	HGNC:25153; Q96EY5
10054	MVB12B	HGNC:23368; Q9H7P6
10055	MVD	HGNC:7529; P53602
10056	MVK	HGNC:7530; Q03426
10057	MVP	HGNC:7531; Q14764
10058	MX1	HGNC:7532; P20591
10059	MX2	HGNC:7533; P20592
10060	MXD1	HGNC:6761; Q05195
10061	MXD3	HGNC:14008; Q9BW11
10062	MXD4	HGNC:13906; Q14582
10063	MXI1	HGNC:7534; P50539
10064	MXRA5	HGNC:7539; Q9NR99
10065	MXRA7	HGNC:7541; P84157
10066	MXRA8	HGNC:7542; Q9BRK3
10067	MYADM	HGNC:7544; Q96S97
10068	MYADML2	HGNC:34548; A6NDP7
10069	MYB	HGNC:7545; P10242
10070	MYBBP1A	HGNC:7546; Q9BQG0
10071	MYBL1	HGNC:7547; P10243
10072	MYBL2	HGNC:7548; P10244
10073	MYBPC1	HGNC:7549; Q00872
10074	MYBPC2	HGNC:7550; Q14324
10075	MYBPC3	HGNC:7551; Q14896
10076	MYBPH	HGNC:7552; Q13203
10077	MYBPHL	HGNC:30434; A2RUH7
10078	MYC	HGNC:7553; P01106
10079	MYCBP	HGNC:7554; Q99417
10080	MYCBP2	HGNC:23386; O75592
10081	MYCBPAP	HGNC:19677; Q8TBZ2
10082	MYCL	HGNC:7555; P12524
10083	MYCN	HGNC:7559; P04198
10084	MYCT1	HGNC:23172; Q8N699
10085	MYD88	HGNC:7562; Q99836
10086	MYDGF	HGNC:16948; Q969H8
10087	MYEF2	HGNC:17940; Q9P2K5
10088	MYEOV	HGNC:7563; Q96EZ4
10089	MYF5	HGNC:7565; P13349
10090	MYF6	HGNC:7566; P23409
10091	MYG1	HGNC:17590; Q9HB07
10092	MYH1	HGNC:7567; P12882
10093	MYH2	HGNC:7572; Q9UKX2
10094	MYH3	HGNC:7573; P11055
10095	MYH4	HGNC:7574; Q9Y623
10096	MYH6	HGNC:7576; P13533
10097	MYH7	HGNC:7577; P12883
10098	MYH7B	HGNC:15906; A7E2Y1
10099	MYH8	HGNC:7578; P13535
10100	MYH9	HGNC:7579; P35579
10101	MYH10	HGNC:7568; P35580
10102	MYH11	HGNC:7569; P35749
10103	MYH13	HGNC:7571; Q9UKX3
10104	MYH14	HGNC:23212; Q7Z406
10105	MYH15	HGNC:31073; Q9Y2K3
10106	MYH16	HGNC:31038; Q9H6N6
10107	MYL1	HGNC:7582; P05976
10108	MYL2	HGNC:7583; P10916
10109	MYL3	HGNC:7584; P08590
10110	MYL4	HGNC:7585; P12829
10111	MYL5	HGNC:7586; Q02045
10112	MYL6	HGNC:7587; P60660
10113	MYL6B	HGNC:29823; P14649
10114	MYL7	HGNC:21719; Q01449
10115	MYL9	HGNC:15754; P24844
10116	MYL10	HGNC:29825; Q9BUA6
10117	MYL11	HGNC:29824; Q96A32
10118	MYL12A	HGNC:16701; P19105
10119	MYL12B	HGNC:29827; O14950
10120	MYLIP	HGNC:21155; Q8WY64
10121	MYLK	HGNC:7590; Q15746
10122	MYLK2	HGNC:16243; Q9H1R3
10123	MYLK3	HGNC:29826; Q32MK0
10124	MYLK4	HGNC:27972; Q86YV6
10125	MYMK	HGNC:33778; A6NI61
10126	MYMX	HGNC:52391; A0A1B0GTQ4
10127	MYNN	HGNC:14955; Q9NPC7
10128	MYO1A	HGNC:7595; Q9UBC5
10129	MYO1B	HGNC:7596; O43795
10130	MYO1C	HGNC:7597; O00159
10131	MYO1D	HGNC:7598; O94832
10132	MYO1E	HGNC:7599; Q12965
10133	MYO1F	HGNC:7600; O00160
10134	MYO1G	HGNC:13880; B0I1T2
10135	MYO1H	HGNC:13879; Q8N1T3
10136	MYO3A	HGNC:7601; Q8NEV4
10137	MYO3B	HGNC:15576; Q8WXR4
10138	MYO5A	HGNC:7602; Q9Y4I1
10139	MYO5B	HGNC:7603; Q9ULV0
10140	MYO5C	HGNC:7604; Q9NQX4
10141	MYO6	HGNC:7605; Q9UM54
10142	MYO7A	HGNC:7606; Q13402
10143	MYO7B	HGNC:7607; Q6PIF6
10144	MYO9A	HGNC:7608; B2RTY4
10145	MYO9B	HGNC:7609; Q13459
10146	MYO10	HGNC:7593; Q9HD67
10147	MYO15A	HGNC:7594; Q9UKN7
10148	MYO15B	HGNC:14083; Q96JP2
10149	MYO16	HGNC:29822; Q9Y6X6
10150	MYO18A	HGNC:31104; O95411, Q92614
10151	MYO18B	HGNC:18150; Q8IUG5
10152	MYO19	HGNC:26234; Q96H55
10153	MYOC	HGNC:7610; Q99972
10154	MYOCD	HGNC:16067; Q8IZQ8
10155	MYOCOS	HGNC:53429; A0A1B0GUC4
10156	MYOD1	HGNC:7611; P15172
10157	MYOF	HGNC:3656; Q9NZM1
10158	MYOG	HGNC:7612; P15173
10159	MYOM1	HGNC:7613; P52179
10160	MYOM2	HGNC:7614; P54296
10161	MYOM3	HGNC:26679; Q5VTT5
10162	MYORG	HGNC:19918; Q6NSJ0
10163	MYOT	HGNC:12399; Q9UBF9
10164	MYOZ1	HGNC:13752; Q9NP98
10165	MYOZ2	HGNC:1330; Q9NPC6
10166	MYOZ3	HGNC:18565; Q8TDC0
10167	MYPN	HGNC:23246; Q86TC9
10168	MYPOP	HGNC:20178; Q86VE0
10169	MYRF	HGNC:1181; Q9Y2G1
10170	MYRFL	HGNC:26316; Q96LU7
10171	MYRIP	HGNC:19156; Q8NFW9
10172	MYSM1	HGNC:29401; Q5VVJ2
10173	MYT1	HGNC:7622; Q01538
10174	MYT1L	HGNC:7623; Q9UL68
10175	MYZAP	HGNC:43444; P0CAP1
10176	MZB1	HGNC:30125; Q8WU39
10177	MZF1	HGNC:13108; P28698
10178	MZT1	HGNC:33830; Q08AG7
10179	MZT2A	HGNC:33187; Q6P582
10180	MZT2B	HGNC:25886; Q6NZ67
10181	N4BP1	HGNC:29850; O75113
10182	N4BP2	HGNC:29851; Q86UW6
10183	N4BP2L1	HGNC:25037; Q5TBK1
10184	N4BP2L2	HGNC:26916; Q92802
10185	N4BP3	HGNC:29852; O15049
10186	NAA10	HGNC:18704; P41227
10187	NAA11	HGNC:28125; Q9BSU3
10188	NAA15	HGNC:30782; Q9BXJ9
10189	NAA16	HGNC:26164; Q6N069
10190	NAA20	HGNC:15908; P61599
10191	NAA25	HGNC:25783; Q14CX7
10192	NAA30	HGNC:19844; Q147X3
10193	NAA35	HGNC:24340; Q5VZE5
10194	NAA38	HGNC:28212; Q9BRA0
10195	NAA40	HGNC:25845; Q86UY6
10196	NAA50	HGNC:29533; Q9GZZ1
10197	NAA60	HGNC:25875; Q9H7X0
10198	NAA80	HGNC:30252; Q93015
10199	NAAA	HGNC:736; Q02083
10200	NAALAD2	HGNC:14526; Q9Y3Q0
10201	NAALADL1	HGNC:23536; Q9UQQ1
10202	NAALADL2	HGNC:23219; Q58DX5
10203	NAB1	HGNC:7626; Q13506
10204	NAB2	HGNC:7627; Q15742
10205	NABP1	HGNC:26232; Q96AH0
10206	NABP2	HGNC:28412; Q9BQ15
10207	NACA	HGNC:7629; E9PAV3, Q13765
10208	NACA2	HGNC:23290; Q9H009
10209	NACAD	HGNC:22196; O15069
10210	NACC1	HGNC:20967; Q96RE7
10211	NACC2	HGNC:23846; Q96BF6
10212	NADK	HGNC:29831; O95544
10213	NADK2	HGNC:26404; Q4G0N4
10214	NADSYN1	HGNC:29832; Q6IA69
10215	NAE1	HGNC:621; Q13564
10216	NAF1	HGNC:25126; Q96HR8
10217	NAGA	HGNC:7631; P17050
10218	NAGK	HGNC:17174; Q9UJ70
10219	NAGLU	HGNC:7632; P54802
10220	NAGPA	HGNC:17378; Q9UK23
10221	NAGS	HGNC:17996; Q8N159
10222	NAIF1	HGNC:25446; Q69YI7
10223	NAIP	HGNC:7634; Q13075
10224	NALCN	HGNC:19082; Q8IZF0
10225	NALF1	HGNC:33877; B1AL88
10226	NALF2	HGNC:30701; O75949
10227	NAMPT	HGNC:30092; P43490
10228	NANOG	HGNC:20857; Q9H9S0
10229	NANOGNB	HGNC:24958; Q7Z5D8
10230	NANOGP8	HGNC:23106; Q6NSW7
10231	NANOS1	HGNC:23044; Q8WY41
10232	NANOS2	HGNC:23292; P60321
10233	NANOS3	HGNC:22048; P60323
10234	NANP	HGNC:16140; Q8TBE9
10235	NANS	HGNC:19237; Q9NR45
10236	NAP1L1	HGNC:7637; P55209
10237	NAP1L2	HGNC:7638; Q9ULW6
10238	NAP1L3	HGNC:7639; Q99457
10239	NAP1L4	HGNC:7640; Q99733
10240	NAP1L5	HGNC:19968; Q96NT1
10241	NAPA	HGNC:7641; P54920
10242	NAPB	HGNC:15751; Q9H115
10243	NAPEPLD	HGNC:21683; Q6IQ20
10244	NAPG	HGNC:7642; Q99747
10245	NAPRT	HGNC:30450; Q6XQN6
10246	NAPSA	HGNC:13395; O96009
10247	NARF	HGNC:29916; Q9UHQ1
10248	NARS1	HGNC:7643; O43776
10249	NARS2	HGNC:26274; Q96I59
10250	NASP	HGNC:7644; P49321
10251	NAT1	HGNC:7645; P18440
10252	NAT2	HGNC:7646; P11245
10253	NAT8	HGNC:18069; Q9UHE5
10254	NAT8B	HGNC:30235; Q9UHF3
10255	NAT8L	HGNC:26742; Q8N9F0
10256	NAT9	HGNC:23133; Q9BTE0
10257	NAT10	HGNC:29830; Q9H0A0
10258	NAT14	HGNC:28918; Q8WUY8
10259	NAT16	HGNC:22030; Q8N8M0
10260	NATD1	HGNC:30770; Q8N6N6
10261	NAV1	HGNC:15989; Q8NEY1
10262	NAV2	HGNC:15997; Q8IVL1
10263	NAV3	HGNC:15998; Q8IVL0
10264	NAXD	HGNC:25576; Q8IW45
10265	NAXE	HGNC:18453; Q8NCW5
10266	NBAS	HGNC:15625; A2RRP1
10267	NBDY	HGNC:50713; A0A0U1RRE5
10268	NBEA	HGNC:7648; Q8NFP9
10269	NBEAL1	HGNC:20681; Q6ZS30
10270	NBEAL2	HGNC:31928; Q6ZNJ1
10271	NBL1	HGNC:7650; P41271
10272	NBN	HGNC:7652; O60934
10273	NBPF1	HGNC:26088; Q3BBV0
10274	NBPF3	HGNC:25076; Q9H094
10275	NBPF4	HGNC:26550; Q96M43
10276	NBPF6	HGNC:31988; Q5VWK0
10277	NBPF8	HGNC:31990; Q3BBV2
10278	NBPF9	HGNC:31991; P0DPF3
10279	NBPF10	HGNC:31992; Q6P3W6
10280	NBPF11	HGNC:31993; Q86T75
10281	NBPF12	HGNC:24297; Q5TAG4
10282	NBPF14	HGNC:25232; Q5TI25
10283	NBPF15	HGNC:28791; Q8N660
10284	NBPF19	HGNC:31999; A0A087WUL8
10285	NBPF20	HGNC:32000; P0DPF2
10286	NBPF26	HGNC:49571; B4DH59
10287	NBR1	HGNC:6746; Q14596
10288	NCALD	HGNC:7655; P61601
10289	NCAM1	HGNC:7656; P13591
10290	NCAM2	HGNC:7657; O15394
10291	NCAN	HGNC:2465; O14594
10292	NCAPD2	HGNC:24305; Q15021
10293	NCAPD3	HGNC:28952; P42695
10294	NCAPG	HGNC:24304; Q9BPX3
10295	NCAPG2	HGNC:21904; Q86XI2
10296	NCAPH	HGNC:1112; Q15003
10297	NCAPH2	HGNC:25071; Q6IBW4
10298	NCBP1	HGNC:7658; Q09161
10299	NCBP2	HGNC:7659; P52298
10300	NCBP2AS2	HGNC:25121; Q69YL0
10301	NCBP2L	HGNC:31795; A6PVI3
10302	NCBP3	HGNC:24612; Q53F19
10303	NCCRP1	HGNC:33739; Q6ZVX7
10304	NCDN	HGNC:17597; Q9UBB6
10305	NCEH1	HGNC:29260; Q6PIU2
10306	NCF1	HGNC:7660; P14598
10307	NCF2	HGNC:7661; P19878
10308	NCF4	HGNC:7662; Q15080
10309	NCK1	HGNC:7664; P16333
10310	NCK2	HGNC:7665; O43639
10311	NCKAP1	HGNC:7666; Q9Y2A7
10312	NCKAP1L	HGNC:4862; P55160
10313	NCKAP5	HGNC:29847; O14513
10314	NCKAP5L	HGNC:29321; Q9HCH0
10315	NCKIPSD	HGNC:15486; Q9NZQ3
10316	NCL	HGNC:7667; P19338
10317	NCLN	HGNC:26923; Q969V3
10318	NCMAP	HGNC:29332; Q5T1S8
10319	NCOA1	HGNC:7668; Q15788
10320	NCOA2	HGNC:7669; Q15596
10321	NCOA3	HGNC:7670; Q9Y6Q9
10322	NCOA4	HGNC:7671; Q13772
10323	NCOA5	HGNC:15909; Q9HCD5
10324	NCOA6	HGNC:15936; Q14686
10325	NCOA7	HGNC:21081; Q8NI08
10326	NCOR1	HGNC:7672; O75376
10327	NCOR2	HGNC:7673; Q9Y618
10328	NCR1	HGNC:6731; O76036
10329	NCR2	HGNC:6732; O95944
10330	NCR3	HGNC:19077; O14931
10331	NCR3LG1	HGNC:42400; Q68D85
10332	NCS1	HGNC:3953; P62166
10333	NCSTN	HGNC:17091; Q92542
10334	NDC1	HGNC:25525; Q9BTX1
10335	NDC80	HGNC:16909; O14777
10336	NDE1	HGNC:17619; Q9NXR1
10337	NDEL1	HGNC:17620; Q9GZM8
10338	NDFIP1	HGNC:17592; Q9BT67
10339	NDFIP2	HGNC:18537; Q9NV92
10340	NDN	HGNC:7675; Q99608
10341	NDNF	HGNC:26256; Q8TB73
10342	NDOR1	HGNC:29838; Q9UHB4
10343	NDP	HGNC:7678; Q00604
10344	NDRG1	HGNC:7679; Q92597
10345	NDRG2	HGNC:14460; Q9UN36
10346	NDRG3	HGNC:14462; Q9UGV2
10347	NDRG4	HGNC:14466; Q9ULP0
10348	NDST1	HGNC:7680; P52848
10349	NDST2	HGNC:7681; P52849
10350	NDST3	HGNC:7682; O95803
10351	NDST4	HGNC:20779; Q9H3R1
10352	NDUFA1	HGNC:7683; O15239
10353	NDUFA2	HGNC:7685; O43678
10354	NDUFA3	HGNC:7686; O95167
10355	NDUFA5	HGNC:7688; Q16718
10356	NDUFA6	HGNC:7690; P56556
10357	NDUFA7	HGNC:7691; O95182
10358	NDUFA8	HGNC:7692; P51970
10359	NDUFA9	HGNC:7693; Q16795
10360	NDUFA10	HGNC:7684; O95299
10361	NDUFA11	HGNC:20371; Q86Y39
10362	NDUFA12	HGNC:23987; Q9UI09
10363	NDUFA13	HGNC:17194; Q9P0J0
10364	NDUFAB1	HGNC:7694; O14561
10365	NDUFAF1	HGNC:18828; Q9Y375
10366	NDUFAF2	HGNC:28086; Q8N183
10367	NDUFAF3	HGNC:29918; Q9BU61
10368	NDUFAF4	HGNC:21034; Q9P032
10369	NDUFAF5	HGNC:15899; Q5TEU4
10370	NDUFAF6	HGNC:28625; Q330K2
10371	NDUFAF7	HGNC:28816; Q7L592
10372	NDUFAF8	HGNC:33551; A1L188
10373	NDUFB1	HGNC:7695; O75438
10374	NDUFB2	HGNC:7697; O95178
10375	NDUFB3	HGNC:7698; O43676
10376	NDUFB4	HGNC:7699; O95168
10377	NDUFB5	HGNC:7700; O43674
10378	NDUFB6	HGNC:7701; O95139
10379	NDUFB7	HGNC:7702; P17568
10380	NDUFB8	HGNC:7703; O95169
10381	NDUFB9	HGNC:7704; Q9Y6M9
10382	NDUFB10	HGNC:7696; O96000
10383	NDUFB11	HGNC:20372; Q9NX14
10384	NDUFC1	HGNC:7705; O43677
10385	NDUFC2	HGNC:7706; O95298
10386	NDUFS1	HGNC:7707; P28331
10387	NDUFS2	HGNC:7708; O75306
10388	NDUFS3	HGNC:7710; O75489
10389	NDUFS4	HGNC:7711; O43181
10390	NDUFS5	HGNC:7712; O43920
10391	NDUFS6	HGNC:7713; O75380
10392	NDUFS7	HGNC:7714; O75251
10393	NDUFS8	HGNC:7715; O00217
10394	NDUFV1	HGNC:7716; P49821
10395	NDUFV2	HGNC:7717; P19404
10396	NDUFV3	HGNC:7719; P56181
10397	NEB	HGNC:7720; P20929
10398	NEBL	HGNC:16932; O76041
10399	NECAB1	HGNC:20983; Q8N987
10400	NECAB2	HGNC:23746; Q7Z6G3
10401	NECAB3	HGNC:15851; Q96P71
10402	NECAP1	HGNC:24539; Q8NC96
10403	NECAP2	HGNC:25528; Q9NVZ3
10404	NECTIN1	HGNC:9706; Q15223
10405	NECTIN2	HGNC:9707; Q92692
10406	NECTIN3	HGNC:17664; Q9NQS3
10407	NECTIN4	HGNC:19688; Q96NY8
10408	NEDD1	HGNC:7723; Q8NHV4
10409	NEDD4	HGNC:7727; P46934
10410	NEDD4L	HGNC:7728; Q96PU5
10411	NEDD8	HGNC:7732; Q15843
10412	NEDD9	HGNC:7733; Q14511
10413	NEFH	HGNC:7737; P12036
10414	NEFL	HGNC:7739; P07196
10415	NEFM	HGNC:7734; P07197
10416	NEGR1	HGNC:17302; Q7Z3B1
10417	NEIL1	HGNC:18448; Q96FI4
10418	NEIL2	HGNC:18956; Q969S2
10419	NEIL3	HGNC:24573; Q8TAT5
10420	NEK1	HGNC:7744; Q96PY6
10421	NEK2	HGNC:7745; P51955
10422	NEK3	HGNC:7746; P51956
10423	NEK4	HGNC:11399; P51957
10424	NEK5	HGNC:7748; Q6P3R8
10425	NEK6	HGNC:7749; Q9HC98
10426	NEK7	HGNC:13386; Q8TDX7
10427	NEK8	HGNC:13387; Q86SG6
10428	NEK9	HGNC:18591; Q8TD19
10429	NEK10	HGNC:18592; Q6ZWH5
10430	NEK11	HGNC:18593; Q8NG66
10431	NELFA	HGNC:12768; Q9H3P2
10432	NELFB	HGNC:24324; Q8WX92
10433	NELFCD	HGNC:15934; Q8IXH7
10434	NELFE	HGNC:13974; P18615
10435	NELL1	HGNC:7750; Q92832
10436	NELL2	HGNC:7751; Q99435
10437	NEMF	HGNC:10663; O60524
10438	NEMP1	HGNC:29001; O14524
10439	NEMP2	HGNC:33700; A6NFY4
10440	NENF	HGNC:30384; Q9UMX5
10441	NEO1	HGNC:7754; Q92859
10442	NES	HGNC:7756; P48681
10443	NET1	HGNC:14592; Q7Z628
10444	NETO1	HGNC:13823; Q8TDF5
10445	NETO2	HGNC:14644; Q8NC67
10446	NEU1	HGNC:7758; Q99519
10447	NEU2	HGNC:7759; Q9Y3R4
10448	NEU3	HGNC:7760; Q9UQ49
10449	NEU4	HGNC:21328; Q8WWR8
10450	NEURL1	HGNC:7761; O76050
10451	NEURL1B	HGNC:35422; A8MQ27
10452	NEURL2	HGNC:16156; Q9BR09
10453	NEURL3	HGNC:25162; Q96EH8
10454	NEURL4	HGNC:34410; Q96JN8
10455	NEUROD1	HGNC:7762; Q13562
10456	NEUROD2	HGNC:7763; Q15784
10457	NEUROD4	HGNC:13802; Q9HD90
10458	NEUROD6	HGNC:13804; Q96NK8
10459	NEUROG1	HGNC:7764; Q92886
10460	NEUROG2	HGNC:13805; Q9H2A3
10461	NEUROG3	HGNC:13806; Q9Y4Z2
10462	NEXMIF	HGNC:29433; Q5QGS0
10463	NEXN	HGNC:29557; Q0ZGT2
10464	NF1	HGNC:7765; P21359
10465	NF2	HGNC:7773; P35240
10466	NFAM1	HGNC:29872; Q8NET5
10467	NFASC	HGNC:29866; O94856
10468	NFAT5	HGNC:7774; O94916
10469	NFATC1	HGNC:7775; O95644
10470	NFATC2	HGNC:7776; Q13469
10471	NFATC2IP	HGNC:25906; Q8NCF5
10472	NFATC3	HGNC:7777; Q12968
10473	NFATC4	HGNC:7778; Q14934
10474	NFE2	HGNC:7780; Q16621
10475	NFE2L1	HGNC:7781; Q14494
10476	NFE2L2	HGNC:7782; Q16236
10477	NFE2L3	HGNC:7783; Q9Y4A8
10478	NFIA	HGNC:7784; Q12857
10479	NFIB	HGNC:7785; O00712
10480	NFIC	HGNC:7786; P08651
10481	NFIL3	HGNC:7787; Q16649
10482	NFILZ	HGNC:52681; A0A5F9ZHS7
10483	NFIX	HGNC:7788; Q14938
10484	NFKB1	HGNC:7794; P19838
10485	NFKB2	HGNC:7795; Q00653
10486	NFKBIA	HGNC:7797; P25963
10487	NFKBIB	HGNC:7798; Q15653
10488	NFKBID	HGNC:15671; Q8NI38
10489	NFKBIE	HGNC:7799; O00221
10490	NFKBIL1	HGNC:7800; Q9UBC1
10491	NFKBIZ	HGNC:29805; Q9BYH8
10492	NFRKB	HGNC:7802; Q6P4R8
10493	NFS1	HGNC:15910; Q9Y697
10494	NFU1	HGNC:16287; Q9UMS0
10495	NFX1	HGNC:7803; Q12986
10496	NFXL1	HGNC:18726; Q6ZNB6
10497	NFYA	HGNC:7804; P23511
10498	NFYB	HGNC:7805; P25208
10499	NFYC	HGNC:7806; Q13952
10500	NGB	HGNC:14077; Q9NPG2
10501	NGDN	HGNC:20271; Q8NEJ9
10502	NGEF	HGNC:7807; Q8N5V2
10503	NGF	HGNC:7808; P01138
10504	NGFR	HGNC:7809; P08138
10505	NGLY1	HGNC:17646; Q96IV0
10506	NGRN	HGNC:18077; Q9NPE2
10507	NHEJ1	HGNC:25737; Q9H9Q4
10508	NHERF1	HGNC:11075; O14745
10509	NHERF2	HGNC:11076; Q15599
10510	NHERF4	HGNC:19891; Q86UT5
10511	NHLH1	HGNC:7817; Q02575
10512	NHLH2	HGNC:7818; Q02577
10513	NHLRC1	HGNC:21576; Q6VVB1
10514	NHLRC2	HGNC:24731; Q8NBF2
10515	NHLRC3	HGNC:33751; Q5JS37
10516	NHLRC4	HGNC:26700; P0CG21
10517	NHP2	HGNC:14377; Q9NX24
10518	NHS	HGNC:7820; Q6T4R5
10519	NHSL1	HGNC:21021; Q5SYE7
10520	NHSL2	HGNC:33737; Q5HYW2
10521	NHSL3	HGNC:29301; Q9P206
10522	NIBAN1	HGNC:16784; Q9BZQ8
10523	NIBAN2	HGNC:25282; Q96TA1
10524	NIBAN3	HGNC:24130; Q86XR2
10525	NICN1	HGNC:18317; Q9BSH3
10526	NICOL1	HGNC:34437; Q5BLP8
10527	NID1	HGNC:7821; P14543
10528	NID2	HGNC:13389; Q14112
10529	NIF3L1	HGNC:13390; Q9GZT8
10530	NIFK	HGNC:17838; Q9BYG3
10531	NIM1K	HGNC:28646; Q8IY84
10532	NIN	HGNC:14906; Q8N4C6
10533	NINJ1	HGNC:7824; Q92982
10534	NINJ2	HGNC:7825; Q9NZG7
10535	NINL	HGNC:29163; Q9Y2I6
10536	NIP7	HGNC:24328; Q9Y221
10537	NIPA1	HGNC:17043; Q7RTP0
10538	NIPA2	HGNC:17044; Q8N8Q9
10539	NIPAL1	HGNC:27194; Q6NVV3
10540	NIPAL2	HGNC:25854; Q9H841
10541	NIPAL3	HGNC:25233; Q6P499
10542	NIPAL4	HGNC:28018; Q0D2K0
10543	NIPBL	HGNC:28862; Q6KC79
10544	NIPSNAP1	HGNC:7827; Q9BPW8
10545	NIPSNAP2	HGNC:4179; O75323
10546	NIPSNAP3A	HGNC:23619; Q9UFN0
10547	NIPSNAP3B	HGNC:23641; Q9BS92
10548	NISCH	HGNC:18006; Q9Y2I1
10549	NIT1	HGNC:7828; Q86X76
10550	NIT2	HGNC:29878; Q9NQR4
10551	NKAIN1	HGNC:25743; Q4KMZ8
10552	NKAIN2	HGNC:16443; Q5VXU1
10553	NKAIN3	HGNC:26829; Q8N8D7
10554	NKAIN4	HGNC:16191; Q8IVV8
10555	NKAP	HGNC:29873; Q8N5F7
10556	NKAPD1	HGNC:25569; Q6ZUT1
10557	NKAPL	HGNC:21584; Q5M9Q1
10558	NKD1	HGNC:17045; Q969G9
10559	NKD2	HGNC:17046; Q969F2
10560	NKG7	HGNC:7830; Q16617
10561	NKIRAS1	HGNC:17899; Q9NYS0
10562	NKIRAS2	HGNC:17898; Q9NYR9
10563	NKPD1	HGNC:24739; Q17RQ9
10564	NKRF	HGNC:19374; O15226
10565	NKTR	HGNC:7833; P30414
10566	NKX1-1	HGNC:24975; Q15270
10567	NKX1-2	HGNC:31652; Q9UD57
10568	NKX2-1	HGNC:11825; P43699
10569	NKX2-2	HGNC:7835; O95096
10570	NKX2-3	HGNC:7836; Q8TAU0
10571	NKX2-4	HGNC:7837; Q9H2Z4
10572	NKX2-5	HGNC:2488; P52952
10573	NKX2-6	HGNC:32940; A6NCS4
10574	NKX2-8	HGNC:16364; O15522
10575	NKX3-1	HGNC:7838; Q99801
10576	NKX3-2	HGNC:951; P78367
10577	NKX6-1	HGNC:7839; P78426
10578	NKX6-2	HGNC:19321; Q9C056
10579	NKX6-3	HGNC:26328; A6NJ46
10580	NLE1	HGNC:19889; Q9NVX2
10581	NLGN1	HGNC:14291; Q8N2Q7
10582	NLGN2	HGNC:14290; Q8NFZ4
10583	NLGN3	HGNC:14289; Q9NZ94
10584	NLGN4X	HGNC:14287; Q8N0W4
10585	NLGN4Y	HGNC:15529; Q8NFZ3
10586	NLK	HGNC:29858; Q9UBE8
10587	NLN	HGNC:16058; Q9BYT8
10588	NLRC3	HGNC:29889; Q7RTR2
10589	NLRC4	HGNC:16412; Q9NPP4
10590	NLRC5	HGNC:29933; Q86WI3
10591	NLRP1	HGNC:14374; Q9C000
10592	NLRP2	HGNC:22948; Q9NX02
10593	NLRP2B	HGNC:29887; P0DMW2
10594	NLRP3	HGNC:16400; Q96P20
10595	NLRP4	HGNC:22943; Q96MN2
10596	NLRP5	HGNC:21269; P59047
10597	NLRP6	HGNC:22944; P59044
10598	NLRP7	HGNC:22947; Q8WX94
10599	NLRP8	HGNC:22940; Q86W28
10600	NLRP9	HGNC:22941; Q7RTR0
10601	NLRP10	HGNC:21464; Q86W26
10602	NLRP11	HGNC:22945; P59045
10603	NLRP12	HGNC:22938; P59046
10604	NLRP13	HGNC:22937; Q86W25
10605	NLRP14	HGNC:22939; Q86W24
10606	NLRX1	HGNC:29890; Q86UT6
10607	NMB	HGNC:7842; P08949
10608	NMBR	HGNC:7843; P28336
10609	NMD3	HGNC:24250; Q96D46
10610	NME1	HGNC:7849; P15531
10611	NME2	HGNC:7850; P22392
10612	NME3	HGNC:7851; Q13232
10613	NME4	HGNC:7852; O00746
10614	NME5	HGNC:7853; P56597
10615	NME6	HGNC:20567; O75414
10616	NME7	HGNC:20461; Q9Y5B8
10617	NME8	HGNC:16473; Q8N427
10618	NME9	HGNC:21343; Q86XW9
10619	NMI	HGNC:7854; Q13287
10620	NMNAT1	HGNC:17877; Q9HAN9
10621	NMNAT2	HGNC:16789; Q9BZQ4
10622	NMNAT3	HGNC:20989; Q96T66
10623	NMRAL1	HGNC:24987; Q9HBL8
10624	NMRK1	HGNC:26057; Q9NWW6
10625	NMRK2	HGNC:17871; Q9NPI5
10626	NMS	HGNC:32203; Q5H8A3
10627	NMT1	HGNC:7857; P30419
10628	NMT2	HGNC:7858; O60551
10629	NMU	HGNC:7859; P48645
10630	NMUR1	HGNC:4518; Q9HB89
10631	NMUR2	HGNC:16454; Q9GZQ4
10632	NNAT	HGNC:7860; Q16517
10633	NNMT	HGNC:7861; P40261
10634	NNT	HGNC:7863; Q13423
10635	NOA1	HGNC:28473; Q8NC60
10636	NOB1	HGNC:29540; Q9ULX3
10637	NOBOX	HGNC:22448; O60393
10638	NOC2L	HGNC:24517; Q9Y3T9
10639	NOC3L	HGNC:24034; Q8WTT2
10640	NOC4L	HGNC:28461; Q9BVI4
10641	NOCT	HGNC:14254; Q9UK39
10642	NOD1	HGNC:16390; Q9Y239
10643	NOD2	HGNC:5331; Q9HC29
10644	NODAL	HGNC:7865; Q96S42
10645	NOG	HGNC:7866; Q13253
10646	NOL3	HGNC:7869; O60936
10647	NOL4	HGNC:7870; O94818
10648	NOL4L	HGNC:16106; Q96MY1
10649	NOL6	HGNC:19910; Q9H6R4
10650	NOL7	HGNC:21040; Q9UMY1
10651	NOL8	HGNC:23387; Q76FK4
10652	NOL9	HGNC:26265; Q5SY16
10653	NOL10	HGNC:25862; Q9BSC4
10654	NOL11	HGNC:24557; Q9H8H0
10655	NOL12	HGNC:28585; Q9UGY1
10656	NOLC1	HGNC:15608; Q14978
10657	NOM1	HGNC:13244; Q5C9Z4
10658	NOMO1	HGNC:30060; Q15155
10659	NOMO2	HGNC:22652; Q5JPE7
10660	NOMO3	HGNC:25242; P69849
10661	NONO	HGNC:7871; Q15233
10662	NOP2	HGNC:7867; P46087
10663	NOP9	HGNC:19826; Q86U38
10664	NOP10	HGNC:14378; Q9NPE3
10665	NOP14	HGNC:16821; P78316
10666	NOP16	HGNC:26934; Q9Y3C1
10667	NOP53	HGNC:4333; Q9NZM5
10668	NOP56	HGNC:15911; O00567
10669	NOP58	HGNC:29926; Q9Y2X3
10670	NOPCHAP1	HGNC:28628; Q8N5I9
10671	NOS1	HGNC:7872; P29475
10672	NOS1AP	HGNC:16859; O75052
10673	NOS2	HGNC:7873; P35228
10674	NOS3	HGNC:7876; P29474
10675	NOSIP	HGNC:17946; Q9Y314
10676	NOSTRIN	HGNC:20203; Q8IVI9
10677	NOTCH1	HGNC:7881; P46531
10678	NOTCH2	HGNC:7882; Q04721
10679	NOTCH2NLA	HGNC:31862; Q7Z3S9
10680	NOTCH2NLB	HGNC:53923; P0DPK3
10681	NOTCH2NLC	HGNC:53924; P0DPK4
10682	NOTCH2NLR	HGNC:53925; A0A096LNW5
10683	NOTCH3	HGNC:7883; Q9UM47
10684	NOTCH4	HGNC:7884; Q99466
10685	NOTO	HGNC:31839; A8MTQ0
10686	NOTUM	HGNC:27106; Q6P988
10687	NOVA1	HGNC:7886; P51513
10688	NOVA2	HGNC:7887; Q9UNW9
10689	NOX1	HGNC:7889; Q9Y5S8
10690	NOX3	HGNC:7890; Q9HBY0
10691	NOX4	HGNC:7891; Q9NPH5
10692	NOX5	HGNC:14874; Q96PH1
10693	NOXA1	HGNC:10668; Q86UR1
10694	NOXO1	HGNC:19404; Q8NFA2
10695	NOXRED1	HGNC:20487; Q6NXP6
10696	NPAP1	HGNC:1190; Q9NZP6
10697	NPAS1	HGNC:7894; Q99742
10698	NPAS2	HGNC:7895; Q99743
10699	NPAS3	HGNC:19311; Q8IXF0
10700	NPAS4	HGNC:18983; Q8IUM7
10701	NPAT	HGNC:7896; Q14207
10702	NPB	HGNC:30099; Q8NG41
10703	NPBWR1	HGNC:4522; P48145
10704	NPBWR2	HGNC:4530; P48146
10705	NPC1	HGNC:7897; O15118
10706	NPC1L1	HGNC:7898; Q9UHC9
10707	NPC2	HGNC:14537; P61916
10708	NPDC1	HGNC:7899; Q9NQX5
10709	NPEPL1	HGNC:16244; Q8NDH3
10710	NPEPPS	HGNC:7900; P55786
10711	NPFF	HGNC:7901; O15130
10712	NPFFR1	HGNC:17425; Q9GZQ6
10713	NPFFR2	HGNC:4525; Q9Y5X5
10714	NPHP1	HGNC:7905; O15259
10715	NPHP3	HGNC:7907; Q7Z494
10716	NPHP4	HGNC:19104; O75161
10717	NPHS1	HGNC:7908; O60500
10718	NPHS2	HGNC:13394; Q9NP85
10719	NPIPA1	HGNC:7909; Q9UND3
10720	NPIPA2	HGNC:41979; E9PIF3
10721	NPIPA3	HGNC:41978; F8WFD2
10722	NPIPA5	HGNC:41980; E9PKD4
10723	NPIPA6	HGNC:27893; P0DXC3
10724	NPIPA7	HGNC:41982; E9PJI5
10725	NPIPA8	HGNC:41983; P0DM63
10726	NPIPA9	HGNC:41984; A0A0B4J1W7
10727	NPIPB2	HGNC:37451; A6NJ64
10728	NPIPB3	HGNC:28989; Q92617
10729	NPIPB4	HGNC:41985; C9JG80
10730	NPIPB5	HGNC:37233; A8MRT5
10731	NPIPB6	HGNC:37454; E9PJ23
10732	NPIPB7	HGNC:33832; O75200
10733	NPIPB8	HGNC:37490; E9PQR5
10734	NPIPB9	HGNC:41987; F8W1W9
10735	NPIPB11	HGNC:37453; E5RHQ5
10736	NPIPB12	HGNC:37491; F8W0I5
10737	NPIPB13	HGNC:41989; A6NJU9
10738	NPIPB15	HGNC:34409; A6NHN6
10739	NPL	HGNC:16781; Q9BXD5
10740	NPLOC4	HGNC:18261; Q8TAT6
10741	NPM1	HGNC:7910; P06748
10742	NPM2	HGNC:7930; Q86SE8
10743	NPM3	HGNC:7931; O75607
10744	NPNT	HGNC:27405; Q6UXI9
10745	NPPA	HGNC:7939; P01160
10746	NPPB	HGNC:7940; P16860
10747	NPPC	HGNC:7941; P23582
10748	NPR1	HGNC:7943; P16066
10749	NPR2	HGNC:7944; P20594
10750	NPR3	HGNC:7945; P17342
10751	NPRL2	HGNC:24969; Q8WTW4
10752	NPRL3	HGNC:14124; Q12980
10753	NPS	HGNC:33940; P0C0P6
10754	NPSR1	HGNC:23631; Q6W5P4
10755	NPTN	HGNC:17867; Q9Y639
10756	NPTX1	HGNC:7952; Q15818
10757	NPTX2	HGNC:7953; P47972
10758	NPTXR	HGNC:7954; O95502
10759	NPVF	HGNC:13782; Q9HCQ7
10760	NPW	HGNC:30509; Q8N729
10761	NPY	HGNC:7955; P01303
10762	NPY1R	HGNC:7956; P25929
10763	NPY2R	HGNC:7957; P49146
10764	NPY4R	HGNC:9329; P50391
10765	NPY4R2	HGNC:52383; P0DQD5
10766	NPY5R	HGNC:7958; Q15761
10767	NQO1	HGNC:2874; P15559
10768	NQO2	HGNC:7856; P16083
10769	NR0B1	HGNC:7960; P51843
10770	NR0B2	HGNC:7961; Q15466
10771	NR1D1	HGNC:7962; P20393
10772	NR1D2	HGNC:7963; Q14995
10773	NR1H2	HGNC:7965; P55055
10774	NR1H3	HGNC:7966; Q13133
10775	NR1H4	HGNC:7967; Q96RI1
10776	NR1I2	HGNC:7968; O75469
10777	NR1I3	HGNC:7969; Q14994
10778	NR2C1	HGNC:7971; P13056
10779	NR2C2	HGNC:7972; P49116
10780	NR2C2AP	HGNC:30763; Q86WQ0
10781	NR2E1	HGNC:7973; Q9Y466
10782	NR2E3	HGNC:7974; Q9Y5X4
10783	NR2F1	HGNC:7975; P10589
10784	NR2F2	HGNC:7976; P24468
10785	NR2F6	HGNC:7977; P10588
10786	NR3C1	HGNC:7978; P04150
10787	NR3C2	HGNC:7979; P08235
10788	NR4A1	HGNC:7980; P22736
10789	NR4A2	HGNC:7981; P43354
10790	NR4A3	HGNC:7982; Q92570
10791	NR5A1	HGNC:7983; Q13285
10792	NR5A2	HGNC:7984; O00482
10793	NR6A1	HGNC:7985; Q15406
10794	NRAP	HGNC:7988; Q86VF7
10795	NRARP	HGNC:33843; Q7Z6K4
10796	NRAS	HGNC:7989; P01111
10797	NRBF2	HGNC:19692; Q96F24
10798	NRBP1	HGNC:7993; Q9UHY1
10799	NRBP2	HGNC:19339; Q9NSY0
10800	NRCAM	HGNC:7994; Q92823
10801	NRDC	HGNC:7995; O43847
10802	NRDE2	HGNC:20186; Q9H7Z3
10803	NREP	HGNC:16834; Q16612
10804	NRF1	HGNC:7996; Q16656
10805	NRG1	HGNC:7997; Q02297
10806	NRG2	HGNC:7998; O14511
10807	NRG3	HGNC:7999; P56975
10808	NRG4	HGNC:29862; Q8WWG1
10809	NRGN	HGNC:8000; Q92686
10810	NRIP1	HGNC:8001; P48552
10811	NRIP2	HGNC:23078; Q9BQI9
10812	NRIP3	HGNC:1167; Q9NQ35
10813	NRK	HGNC:25391; Q7Z2Y5
10814	NRL	HGNC:8002; P54845
10815	NRM	HGNC:8003; Q8IXM6
10816	NRN1	HGNC:17972; Q9NPD7
10817	NRN1L	HGNC:29811; Q496H8
10818	NRP1	HGNC:8004; O14786
10819	NRP2	HGNC:8005; O60462
10820	NRROS	HGNC:24613; Q86YC3
10821	NRSN1	HGNC:17881; Q8IZ57
10822	NRSN2	HGNC:16229; Q9GZP1
10823	NRTN	HGNC:8007; Q99748
10824	NRXN1	HGNC:8008; P58400, Q9ULB1
10825	NRXN2	HGNC:8009; P58401, Q9P2S2
10826	NRXN3	HGNC:8010; Q9HDB5, Q9Y4C0
10827	NSA2	HGNC:30728; O95478
10828	NSD1	HGNC:14234; Q96L73
10829	NSD2	HGNC:12766; O96028
10830	NSD3	HGNC:12767; Q9BZ95
10831	NSDHL	HGNC:13398; Q15738
10832	NSF	HGNC:8016; P46459
10833	NSFL1C	HGNC:15912; Q9UNZ2
10834	NSG1	HGNC:18790; P42857
10835	NSG2	HGNC:24955; Q9Y328
10836	NSL1	HGNC:24548; Q96IY1
10837	NSMAF	HGNC:8017; Q92636
10838	NSMCE1	HGNC:29897; Q8WV22
10839	NSMCE2	HGNC:26513; Q96MF7
10840	NSMCE3	HGNC:7677; Q96MG7
10841	NSMCE4A	HGNC:25935; Q9NXX6
10842	NSMF	HGNC:29843; Q6X4W1
10843	NSRP1	HGNC:25305; Q9H0G5
10844	NSUN2	HGNC:25994; Q08J23
10845	NSUN3	HGNC:26208; Q9H649
10846	NSUN4	HGNC:31802; Q96CB9
10847	NSUN5	HGNC:16385; Q96P11
10848	NSUN6	HGNC:23529; Q8TEA1
10849	NSUN7	HGNC:25857; Q8NE18
10850	NT5C	HGNC:17144; Q8TCD5
10851	NT5C1A	HGNC:17819; Q9BXI3
10852	NT5C1B	HGNC:17818; Q96P26
10853	NT5C2	HGNC:8022; P49902
10854	NT5C3A	HGNC:17820; Q9H0P0
10855	NT5C3B	HGNC:28300; Q969T7
10856	NT5DC1	HGNC:21556; Q5TFE4
10857	NT5DC2	HGNC:25717; Q9H857
10858	NT5DC3	HGNC:30826; Q86UY8
10859	NT5DC4	HGNC:27678; Q86YG4
10860	NT5E	HGNC:8021; P21589
10861	NT5M	HGNC:15769; Q9NPB1
10862	NTAN1	HGNC:29909; Q96AB6
10863	NTAQ1	HGNC:25490; Q96HA8
10864	NTF3	HGNC:8023; P20783
10865	NTF4	HGNC:8024; P34130
10866	NTHL1	HGNC:8028; P78549
10867	NTM	HGNC:17941; Q9P121
10868	NTMT1	HGNC:23373; Q9BV86
10869	NTMT2	HGNC:31932; Q5VVY1
10870	NTN1	HGNC:8029; O95631
10871	NTN3	HGNC:8030; O00634
10872	NTN4	HGNC:13658; Q9HB63
10873	NTN5	HGNC:25208; Q8WTR8
10874	NTNG1	HGNC:23319; Q9Y2I2
10875	NTNG2	HGNC:14288; Q96CW9
10876	NTPCR	HGNC:28204; Q9BSD7
10877	NTRK1	HGNC:8031; P04629
10878	NTRK2	HGNC:8032; Q16620
10879	NTRK3	HGNC:8033; Q16288
10880	NTS	HGNC:8038; P30990
10881	NTSR1	HGNC:8039; P30989
10882	NTSR2	HGNC:8040; O95665
10883	NUAK1	HGNC:14311; O60285
10884	NUAK2	HGNC:29558; Q9H093
10885	NUB1	HGNC:17623; Q9Y5A7
10886	NUBP1	HGNC:8041; P53384
10887	NUBP2	HGNC:8042; Q9Y5Y2
10888	NUBPL	HGNC:20278; Q8TB37
10889	NUCB1	HGNC:8043; Q02818
10890	NUCB2	HGNC:8044; P80303
10891	NUCKS1	HGNC:29923; Q9H1E3
10892	NUDC	HGNC:8045; Q9Y266
10893	NUDCD1	HGNC:24306; Q96RS6
10894	NUDCD2	HGNC:30535; Q8WVJ2
10895	NUDCD3	HGNC:22208; Q8IVD9
10896	NUDT1	HGNC:8048; P36639
10897	NUDT2	HGNC:8049; P50583
10898	NUDT3	HGNC:8050; O95989
10899	NUDT4	HGNC:8051; Q9NZJ9
10900	NUDT4B	HGNC:18012; A0A024RBG1
10901	NUDT5	HGNC:8052; Q9UKK9
10902	NUDT6	HGNC:8053; P53370
10903	NUDT7	HGNC:8054; P0C024
10904	NUDT8	HGNC:8055; Q8WV74
10905	NUDT9	HGNC:8056; Q9BW91
10906	NUDT10	HGNC:17621; Q8NFP7
10907	NUDT11	HGNC:18011; Q96G61
10908	NUDT12	HGNC:18826; Q9BQG2
10909	NUDT13	HGNC:18827; Q86X67
10910	NUDT14	HGNC:20141; O95848
10911	NUDT15	HGNC:23063; Q9NV35
10912	NUDT16	HGNC:26442; Q96DE0
10913	NUDT16L1	HGNC:28154; Q9BRJ7
10914	NUDT17	HGNC:26618; P0C025
10915	NUDT18	HGNC:26194; Q6ZVK8
10916	NUDT19	HGNC:32036; A8MXV4
10917	NUDT21	HGNC:13870; O43809
10918	NUDT22	HGNC:28189; Q9BRQ3
10919	NUF2	HGNC:14621; Q9BZD4
10920	NUFIP1	HGNC:8057; Q9UHK0
10921	NUFIP2	HGNC:17634; Q7Z417
10922	NUGGC	HGNC:33550; Q68CJ6
10923	NUMA1	HGNC:8059; Q14980
10924	NUMB	HGNC:8060; P49757
10925	NUMBL	HGNC:8061; Q9Y6R0
10926	NUP35	HGNC:29797; Q8NFH5
10927	NUP37	HGNC:29929; Q8NFH4
10928	NUP42	HGNC:17010; O15504
10929	NUP43	HGNC:21182; Q8NFH3
10930	NUP50	HGNC:8065; Q9UKX7
10931	NUP54	HGNC:17359; Q7Z3B4
10932	NUP58	HGNC:20261; Q9BVL2
10933	NUP62	HGNC:8066; P37198
10934	NUP62CL	HGNC:25960; Q9H1M0
10935	NUP85	HGNC:8734; Q9BW27
10936	NUP88	HGNC:8067; Q99567
10937	NUP93	HGNC:28958; Q8N1F7
10938	NUP98	HGNC:8068; P52948
10939	NUP107	HGNC:29914; P57740
10940	NUP133	HGNC:18016; Q8WUM0
10941	NUP153	HGNC:8062; P49790
10942	NUP155	HGNC:8063; O75694
10943	NUP160	HGNC:18017; Q12769
10944	NUP188	HGNC:17859; Q5SRE5
10945	NUP205	HGNC:18658; Q92621
10946	NUP210	HGNC:30052; Q8TEM1
10947	NUP210L	HGNC:29915; Q5VU65
10948	NUP214	HGNC:8064; P35658
10949	NUPR1	HGNC:29990; O60356
10950	NUPR2	HGNC:44164; A6NF83
10951	NUS1	HGNC:21042; Q96E22
10952	NUSAP1	HGNC:18538; Q9BXS6
10953	NUTF2	HGNC:13722; P61970
10954	NUTM1	HGNC:29919; Q86Y26
10955	NUTM2A	HGNC:23438; Q8IVF1
10956	NUTM2B	HGNC:23445; A6NNL0
10957	NUTM2D	HGNC:23447; Q5VT03
10958	NUTM2E	HGNC:23448; B1AL46
10959	NUTM2F	HGNC:23450; A1L443
10960	NUTM2G	HGNC:23449; Q5VZR2
10961	NVL	HGNC:8070; O15381
10962	NWD1	HGNC:27619; Q149M9
10963	NWD2	HGNC:29229; Q9ULI1
10964	NXF1	HGNC:8071; Q9UBU9
10965	NXF2	HGNC:8072; Q9GZY0
10966	NXF2B	HGNC:23984; Q9GZY0
10967	NXF3	HGNC:8073; Q9H4D5
10968	NXF5	HGNC:8075; Q9H1B4
10969	NXN	HGNC:18008; Q6DKJ4
10970	NXNL1	HGNC:25179; Q96CM4
10971	NXNL2	HGNC:30482; Q5VZ03
10972	NXPE1	HGNC:28527; Q8N323
10973	NXPE2	HGNC:26331; Q96DL1
10974	NXPE3	HGNC:28238; Q969Y0
10975	NXPE4	HGNC:23117; Q6UWF7
10976	NXPH1	HGNC:20693; P58417
10977	NXPH2	HGNC:8076; O95156
10978	NXPH3	HGNC:8077; O95157
10979	NXPH4	HGNC:8078; O95158
10980	NXT1	HGNC:15913; Q9UKK6
10981	NXT2	HGNC:18151; Q9NPJ8
10982	NYAP1	HGNC:22009; Q6ZVC0
10983	NYAP2	HGNC:29291; Q9P242
10984	NYNRIN	HGNC:20165; Q9P2P1
10985	NYX	HGNC:8082; Q9GZU5
10986	OAF	HGNC:28752; Q86UD1
10987	OARD1	HGNC:21257; Q9Y530
10988	OAS1	HGNC:8086; P00973
10989	OAS2	HGNC:8087; P29728
10990	OAS3	HGNC:8088; Q9Y6K5
10991	OASL	HGNC:8090; Q15646
10992	OAT	HGNC:8091; P04181
10993	OAZ1	HGNC:8095; P54368
10994	OAZ2	HGNC:8096; O95190
10995	OAZ3	HGNC:8097; Q9UMX2
10996	OBI1	HGNC:20308; Q5W0B1
10997	OBP2A	HGNC:23380; Q9NY56
10998	OBP2B	HGNC:23381; Q9NPH6
10999	OBSCN	HGNC:15719; Q5VST9
11000	OBSL1	HGNC:29092; O75147
11001	OC90	HGNC:8100; Q02509
11002	OCA2	HGNC:8101; Q04671
11003	OCEL1	HGNC:26221; Q9H607
11004	OCIAD1	HGNC:16074; Q9NX40
11005	OCIAD2	HGNC:28685; Q56VL3
11006	OCLN	HGNC:8104; Q16625
11007	OCM	HGNC:8105; P0CE72
11008	OCM2	HGNC:34396; P0CE71
11009	OCRL	HGNC:8108; Q01968
11010	OCSTAMP	HGNC:16116; Q9BR26
11011	ODAD1	HGNC:26560; Q96M63
11012	ODAD2	HGNC:25583; Q5T2S8
11013	ODAD3	HGNC:28303; A5D8V7
11014	ODAD4	HGNC:25280; Q96NG3
11015	ODAM	HGNC:26043; A1E959
11016	ODAPH	HGNC:26300; Q17RF5
11017	ODC1	HGNC:8109; P11926
11018	ODF1	HGNC:8113; Q14990
11019	ODF2	HGNC:8114; Q5BJF6
11020	ODF2L	HGNC:29225; Q9ULJ1
11021	ODF4	HGNC:19056; Q2M2E3
11022	ODR4	HGNC:24299; Q5SWX8
11023	OFD1	HGNC:2567; O75665
11024	OGA	HGNC:7056; O60502
11025	OGDH	HGNC:8124; Q02218
11026	OGDHL	HGNC:25590; Q9ULD0
11027	OGFOD1	HGNC:25585; Q8N543
11028	OGFOD2	HGNC:25823; Q6N063
11029	OGFOD3	HGNC:26174; Q6PK18
11030	OGFR	HGNC:15768; Q9NZT2
11031	OGFRL1	HGNC:21378; Q5TC84
11032	OGG1	HGNC:8125; O15527
11033	OGN	HGNC:8126; P20774
11034	OGT	HGNC:8127; O15294
11035	OIP5	HGNC:20300; O43482
11036	OIT3	HGNC:29953; Q8WWZ8
11037	OLA1	HGNC:28833; Q9NTK5
11038	OLAH	HGNC:25625; Q9NV23
11039	OLFM1	HGNC:17187; Q99784
11040	OLFM2	HGNC:17189; O95897
11041	OLFM3	HGNC:17990; Q96PB7
11042	OLFM4	HGNC:17190; Q6UX06
11043	OLFML1	HGNC:24473; Q6UWY5
11044	OLFML2A	HGNC:27270; Q68BL7
11045	OLFML2B	HGNC:24558; Q68BL8
11046	OLFML3	HGNC:24956; Q9NRN5
11047	OLIG1	HGNC:16983; Q8TAK6
11048	OLIG2	HGNC:9398; Q13516
11049	OLIG3	HGNC:18003; Q7RTU3
11050	OLR1	HGNC:8133; P78380
11051	OMA1	HGNC:29661; Q96E52
11052	OMD	HGNC:8134; Q99983
11053	OMG	HGNC:8135; P23515
11054	OMP	HGNC:8136; P47874
11055	ONECUT1	HGNC:8138; Q9UBC0
11056	ONECUT2	HGNC:8139; O95948
11057	ONECUT3	HGNC:13399; O60422
11058	OOEP	HGNC:21382; A6NGQ2
11059	OOSP1	HGNC:49233; A8MZH6
11060	OOSP2	HGNC:26699; Q86WS3
11061	OOSP3	HGNC:53903; A0A2R8YFM6
11062	OOSP4A	HGNC:53904; A0A2R8YFL7
11063	OOSP4B	HGNC:53905; A0A2R8Y4Y8
11064	OPA1	HGNC:8140; O60313
11065	OPA3	HGNC:8142; Q9H6K4
11066	OPALIN	HGNC:20707; Q96PE5
11067	OPCML	HGNC:8143; Q14982
11068	OPHN1	HGNC:8148; O60890
11069	OPLAH	HGNC:8149; O14841
11070	OPN1LW	HGNC:9936; P04000
11071	OPN1MW	HGNC:4206; P04001
11072	OPN1MW2	HGNC:26952; P0DN77
11073	OPN1MW3	HGNC:51831; P0DN78
11074	OPN1SW	HGNC:1012; P03999
11075	OPN3	HGNC:14007; Q9H1Y3
11076	OPN4	HGNC:14449; Q9UHM6
11077	OPN5	HGNC:19992; Q6U736
11078	OPRD1	HGNC:8153; P41143
11079	OPRK1	HGNC:8154; P41145
11080	OPRL1	HGNC:8155; P41146
11081	OPRM1	HGNC:8156; P35372
11082	OPRPN	HGNC:17279; Q99935
11083	OPTC	HGNC:8158; Q9UBM4
11084	OPTN	HGNC:17142; Q96CV9
11085	OR1A1	HGNC:8179; Q9P1Q5
11086	OR1A2	HGNC:8180; Q9Y585
11087	OR1B1	HGNC:8181; Q8NGR6
11088	OR1C1	HGNC:8182; Q15619
11089	OR1D2	HGNC:8183; P34982
11090	OR1D4	HGNC:8185; P47884
11091	OR1D5	HGNC:8186; P58170
11092	OR1E1	HGNC:8189; P30953
11093	OR1E2	HGNC:8190; P47887
11094	OR1E3	HGNC:8191; Q8WZA6
11095	OR1F1	HGNC:8194; O43749
11096	OR1G1	HGNC:8204; P47890
11097	OR1I1	HGNC:8207; O60431
11098	OR1J1	HGNC:8208; Q8NGS3
11099	OR1J2	HGNC:8209; Q8NGS2
11100	OR1J4	HGNC:8211; Q8NGS1
11101	OR1K1	HGNC:8212; Q8NGR3
11102	OR1L1	HGNC:8213; Q8NH94
11103	OR1L3	HGNC:8215; Q8NH93
11104	OR1L4	HGNC:8216; Q8NGR5
11105	OR1L6	HGNC:8218; Q8NGR2
11106	OR1L8	HGNC:15110; Q8NGR8
11107	OR1M1	HGNC:8220; Q8NGA1
11108	OR1N1	HGNC:8221; Q8NGS0
11109	OR1N2	HGNC:15111; Q8NGR9
11110	OR1P1	HGNC:8222; Q8NH06
11111	OR1Q1	HGNC:8223; Q15612
11112	OR1R1	HGNC:8226
11113	OR1S1	HGNC:8227; Q8NH92
11114	OR1S2	HGNC:15141; Q8NGQ3
11115	OR2A1	HGNC:8229; Q8NGT9
11116	OR2A2	HGNC:8230; Q6IF42
11117	OR2A4	HGNC:14729; O95047
11118	OR2A5	HGNC:8232; Q96R48
11119	OR2A7	HGNC:8234; Q96R45
11120	OR2A12	HGNC:15082; Q8NGT7
11121	OR2A14	HGNC:15084; Q96R47
11122	OR2A25	HGNC:19562; A4D2G3
11123	OR2A42	HGNC:31230; Q8NGT9
11124	OR2AE1	HGNC:15087; Q8NHA4
11125	OR2AG1	HGNC:15142; Q9H205
11126	OR2AG2	HGNC:15143; A6NM03
11127	OR2AJ1	HGNC:15001; Q8NGZ0
11128	OR2AK2	HGNC:19569; Q8NG84
11129	OR2AP1	HGNC:15335; Q8NGE2
11130	OR2AT4	HGNC:19620; A6NND4
11131	OR2B2	HGNC:13966; Q9GZK3
11132	OR2B3	HGNC:8238; O76000
11133	OR2B6	HGNC:8241; P58173
11134	OR2B8	HGNC:13968; P59922
11135	OR2B11	HGNC:31249; Q5JQS5
11136	OR2C1	HGNC:8242; O95371
11137	OR2C3	HGNC:15005; Q8N628
11138	OR2D2	HGNC:8244; Q9H210
11139	OR2D3	HGNC:15146; Q8NGH3
11140	OR2F1	HGNC:8246; Q13607
11141	OR2F2	HGNC:8247; O95006
11142	OR2G2	HGNC:15007; Q8NGZ5
11143	OR2G3	HGNC:15008; Q8NGZ4
11144	OR2G6	HGNC:27019; Q5TZ20
11145	OR2H1	HGNC:8252; Q9GZK4
11146	OR2H2	HGNC:8253; O95918
11147	OR2I1	HGNC:8258; Q8NGU4
11148	OR2J1	HGNC:8259; Q9GZK6
11149	OR2J2	HGNC:8260; O76002
11150	OR2J3	HGNC:8261; O76001
11151	OR2K2	HGNC:8264; Q8NGT1
11152	OR2L2	HGNC:8266; Q8NH16
11153	OR2L3	HGNC:15009; Q8NG85
11154	OR2L5	HGNC:15011; Q8NG80
11155	OR2L8	HGNC:15014; Q8NGY9
11156	OR2L13	HGNC:19578; Q8N349
11157	OR2M2	HGNC:8268; Q96R28
11158	OR2M3	HGNC:8269; Q8NG83
11159	OR2M4	HGNC:8270; Q96R27
11160	OR2M5	HGNC:19576; A3KFT3
11161	OR2M7	HGNC:19594; Q8NG81
11162	OR2S2	HGNC:8276; Q9NQN1
11163	OR2T1	HGNC:8277; O43869
11164	OR2T2	HGNC:14725; Q6IF00
11165	OR2T3	HGNC:14727; Q8NH03
11166	OR2T4	HGNC:15016; Q8NH00
11167	OR2T5	HGNC:15017; Q6IEZ7
11168	OR2T6	HGNC:15018; Q8NHC8
11169	OR2T7	HGNC:15019; P0C7T2
11170	OR2T8	HGNC:15020; A6NH00
11171	OR2T10	HGNC:19573; Q8NGZ9
11172	OR2T11	HGNC:19574; Q8NH01
11173	OR2T12	HGNC:19592; Q8NG77
11174	OR2T27	HGNC:31252; Q8NH04
11175	OR2T29	HGNC:31253; Q8NH02
11176	OR2T33	HGNC:31255; Q8NG76
11177	OR2T34	HGNC:31256; Q8NGX1
11178	OR2T35	HGNC:31257; Q8NGX2
11179	OR2V1	HGNC:8280; Q8NHB1
11180	OR2V2	HGNC:15341; Q96R30
11181	OR2W1	HGNC:8281; Q9Y3N9
11182	OR2W3	HGNC:15021; Q7Z3T1
11183	OR2Y1	HGNC:14837; Q8NGV0
11184	OR2Z1	HGNC:15391; Q8NG97
11185	OR3A1	HGNC:8282; P47881
11186	OR3A2	HGNC:8283; P47893
11187	OR3A3	HGNC:8284; P47888
11188	OR4A5	HGNC:15162; Q8NH83
11189	OR4A8	HGNC:15165; P0C604
11190	OR4A15	HGNC:15152; Q8NGL6
11191	OR4A16	HGNC:15153; Q8NH70
11192	OR4A47	HGNC:31266; Q6IF82
11193	OR4B1	HGNC:8290; Q8NGF8
11194	OR4C3	HGNC:14697; Q8NH37
11195	OR4C5	HGNC:14702; Q8NGB2
11196	OR4C6	HGNC:14743; Q8NH72
11197	OR4C11	HGNC:15167; Q6IEV9
11198	OR4C12	HGNC:15168; Q96R67
11199	OR4C13	HGNC:15169; Q8NGP0
11200	OR4C15	HGNC:15171; Q8NGM1
11201	OR4C16	HGNC:15172; Q8NGL9
11202	OR4C45	HGNC:31270; A6NMZ5
11203	OR4C46	HGNC:31271; A6NHA9
11204	OR4D1	HGNC:8293; Q15615
11205	OR4D2	HGNC:8294; P58180
11206	OR4D5	HGNC:14852; Q8NGN0
11207	OR4D6	HGNC:15175; Q8NGJ1
11208	OR4D9	HGNC:15178; Q8NGE8
11209	OR4D10	HGNC:15173; Q8NGI6
11210	OR4D11	HGNC:15174; Q8NGI4
11211	OR4E1	HGNC:8296; P0C645
11212	OR4E2	HGNC:8297; Q8NGC2
11213	OR4F3	HGNC:8300; Q6IEY1
11214	OR4F4	HGNC:8301; Q96R69
11215	OR4F5	HGNC:14825; Q8NH21
11216	OR4F6	HGNC:15372; Q8NGB9
11217	OR4F15	HGNC:15078; Q8NGB8
11218	OR4F16	HGNC:15079; Q6IEY1
11219	OR4F17	HGNC:15381; Q8NGA8
11220	OR4F21	HGNC:19583; O95013
11221	OR4F29	HGNC:31275; Q6IEY1
11222	OR4K1	HGNC:14726; Q8NGD4
11223	OR4K2	HGNC:14728; Q8NGD2
11224	OR4K3	HGNC:14731; Q96R72
11225	OR4K5	HGNC:14745; Q8NGD3
11226	OR4K13	HGNC:15351; Q8NH42
11227	OR4K14	HGNC:15352; Q8NGD5
11228	OR4K15	HGNC:15353; Q8NH41
11229	OR4K17	HGNC:15355; Q8NGC6
11230	OR4L1	HGNC:15356; Q8NH43
11231	OR4M1	HGNC:14735; Q8NGD0
11232	OR4M2	HGNC:15373; Q8NGB6
11233	OR4M2B	HGNC:55109; A0A0X1KG70
11234	OR4N2	HGNC:14742; Q8NGD1
11235	OR4N4	HGNC:15375; Q8N0Y3
11236	OR4N4C	HGNC:55110; A0A096LPK9
11237	OR4N5	HGNC:15358; Q8IXE1
11238	OR4P4	HGNC:15180; Q8NGL7
11239	OR4Q2	HGNC:15359; P0C623
11240	OR4Q3	HGNC:15426; Q8NH05
11241	OR4S1	HGNC:14705; Q8NGB4
11242	OR4S2	HGNC:15183; Q8NH73
11243	OR4X1	HGNC:14854; Q8NH49
11244	OR4X2	HGNC:15184; Q8NGF9
11245	OR5A1	HGNC:8319; Q8NGJ0
11246	OR5A2	HGNC:15249; Q8NGI9
11247	OR5AC1	HGNC:15047; P0C628
11248	OR5AC2	HGNC:15431; Q9NZP5
11249	OR5AK2	HGNC:15251; Q8NH90
11250	OR5AL1	HGNC:14844; P0C617
