= MAB21L3 =

Protein-coding gene in humans

Identifiers
- Aliases: MAB21L3, C1orf161, mab-21 like 3
- External IDs: MGI: 2446273; GeneCards: MAB21L3

Gene location (Human)
| Chr. | Chromosome 1 (human) |
| Band | 1p13.1 | Start | 116,111,399 bp |
| Band | 1p13.1 | End | 116,138,149 bp |

Gene location (Mouse)
| Chr. | Chromosome 3 (mouse) |
| Band | 3|3 F2.2 | Start | 101,720,392 bp |
| Band | 3|3 F2.2 | End | 101,756,275 bp |
RNA expression pattern
| Bgee | Human / Mouse (ortholog); Top expressed in: oral cavity; rectum; mucosa of transverse colon; skin of abdomen; skin of leg; vagina; palpebral conjunctiva; skin of hip; amniotic fluid; human kidney / Top expressed in: cervix; molar; secondary oocyte; zygote; primary oocyte; blastocyst; hair follicle; blastocyst; mesenteric lymph nodes; lip; More reference expression data |
| BioGPS | n/a |
Orthologs
| Databases | NCBI: entry; OMA: entry |
| Species | Human | Mouse |
| Entrez | 126868 | 242125 |
| Ensembl | ENSG00000173212 | ENSMUSG00000044313 |
| UniProt | Q8N8X9 | Q8CI17 |
| RefSeq (mRNA) | NM_152367 | NM_172295 |
| RefSeq (protein) | NP_689580 | NP_758499 |
| Location (UCSC) | Chr 1: 116.11 – 116.14 Mb | Chr 3: 101.72 – 101.76 Mb |
| PubMed search |
- Wikidata
| View/Edit Human | View/Edit Mouse |

Mab-21 like 3 is a protein that in humans is encoded by the MAB21L3 gene.
