= OR2T12 =

Protein-coding gene in humans

Identifiers
- Aliases: OR2T12, OR1-57, olfactory receptor family 2 subfamily T member 12
- External IDs: MGI: 3030148; GeneCards: OR2T12

Gene location (Human)
Chr.	Chromosome 1 (human)
Band	1q44	Start	248,290,139 bp
Band	1q44	End	248,303,424 bp

Gene location (Mouse)
Chr.	Chromosome 11 (mouse)
Band	11|11 B1.3	Start	58,673,778 bp
Band	11|11 B1.3	End	58,679,594 bp
RNA expression pattern
Bgee	Human / Mouse (ortholog); Top expressed in: gonad / n/a; More reference expression data
BioGPS	n/a
Gene ontology
Molecular function	G protein-coupled receptor activity; olfactory receptor activity; signal transducer activity
Cellular component	integral component of membrane; plasma membrane; membrane
Biological process	sensory perception of smell; signal transduction; response to stimulus; detection of chemical stimulus involved in sensory perception of smell; G protein-coupled receptor signaling pathway
Sources:Amigo / QuickGO
Orthologs
Databases	NCBI: entry; OMA: entry
Species	Human	Mouse
Entrez	127064	257917
Ensembl	ENSG00000177201	ENSMUSG00000059504
UniProt	Q8NG77	Q7TRZ7
RefSeq (mRNA)	NM_001004692	NM_001011760
RefSeq (protein)	NP_001004692	NP_001011760
Location (UCSC)	Chr 1: 248.29 – 248.3 Mb	Chr 11: 58.67 – 58.68 Mb
PubMed search
- Wikidata
View/Edit Human	View/Edit Mouse

Olfactory receptor 2T12 is a protein that in humans is encoded by the OR2T12 gene.

Olfactory receptors interact with odorant molecules in the nose, to initiate a neuronal response that triggers the perception of a smell. The olfactory receptor proteins are members of a large family of G-protein-coupled receptors (GPCR) arising from single coding-exon genes. Olfactory receptors share a 7-transmembrane domain structure with many neurotransmitter and hormone receptors and are responsible for the recognition and G protein-mediated transduction of odorant signals. The olfactory receptor gene family is the largest in the genome. The nomenclature assigned to the olfactory receptor genes and proteins for this organism is independent of other organisms.

== See also ==
- Olfactory receptor
