= OR2H2 =

Protein-coding gene in the species Homo sapiens

Identifiers
- Aliases: OR2H2, FAT11, OLFR2, OLFR42B, OR2H3, dJ271M21.2, hs6M1-12, olfactory receptor family 2 subfamily H member 2
- External IDs: OMIM: 600578; MGI: 2177473; GeneCards: OR2H2

Gene location (Human)
Chr.	Chromosome 6 (human)
Band	6p22.1	Start	29,585,121 bp
Band	6p22.1	End	29,590,500 bp

Gene location (Mouse)
Chr.	Chromosome 17 (mouse)
Band	17|17 B1	Start	37,394,763 bp
Band	17|17 B1	End	37,399,391 bp
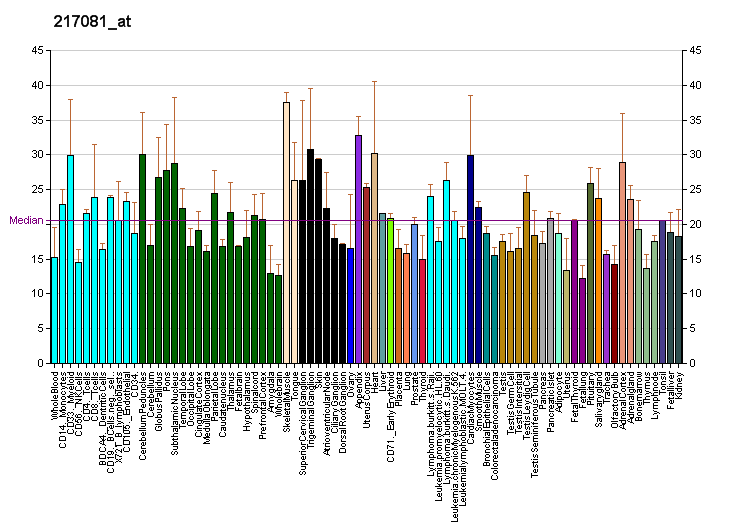

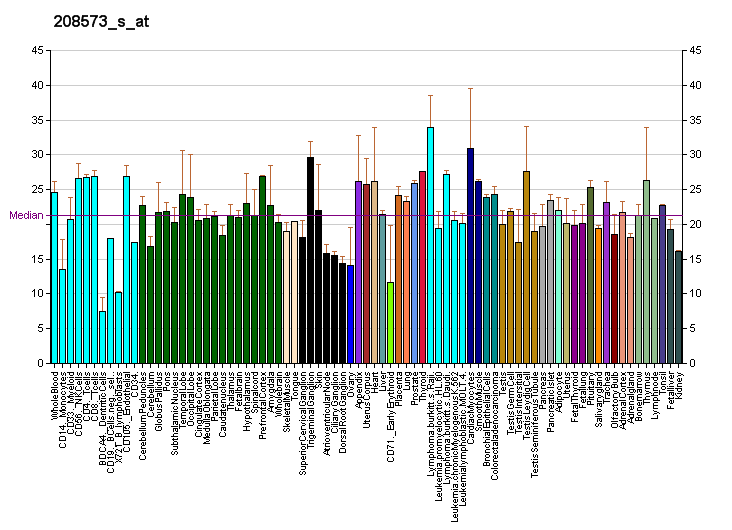
RNA expression pattern
Bgee	Human / Mouse (ortholog); Top expressed in: testicle; putamen; nucleus accumbens; caudate nucleus; right hemisphere of cerebellum; ventricular zone; temporal lobe; amygdala; hippocampus proper; anterior cingulate cortex / Top expressed in: embryo; blastocyst; bone marrow; conceptus; female human reproductive system; placenta; More reference expression data
BioGPS	More reference expression data
Gene ontology
Molecular function	G protein-coupled receptor activity; signal transducer activity; olfactory receptor activity
Cellular component	integral component of membrane; plasma membrane; membrane
Biological process	defense response; mating; signal transduction; response to stimulus; detection of chemical stimulus involved in sensory perception of smell; sensory perception of smell; G protein-coupled receptor signaling pathway
Sources:Amigo / QuickGO
Orthologs
Databases	NCBI: entry; OMA: entry
Species	Human	Mouse
Entrez	7932	258469
Ensembl	ENSG00000204657	ENSMUSG00000056600
UniProt	O95918	n/a
RefSeq (mRNA)	NM_007160	NM_146477
RefSeq (protein)	NP_009091	n/a
Location (UCSC)	Chr 6: 29.59 – 29.59 Mb	Chr 17: 37.39 – 37.4 Mb
PubMed search
- Wikidata
View/Edit Human	View/Edit Mouse

Olfactory receptor 2H2 is a protein that in humans is encoded by the OR2H2 gene.

Olfactory receptors interact with odorant molecules in the nose, to initiate a neuronal response that triggers the perception of a smell. The olfactory receptor proteins are members of a large family of G-protein-coupled receptors (GPCR) arising from single coding-exon genes. Olfactory receptors share a 7-transmembrane domain structure with many neurotransmitter and hormone receptors and are responsible for the recognition and G protein-mediated transduction of odorant signals. The olfactory receptor gene family is the largest in the genome. The nomenclature assigned to the olfactory receptor genes and proteins for this organism is independent of other organisms.

== See also ==
- Olfactory receptor
