= MAP3K6 =

Protein found in humans

An Error has occurred retrieving Wikidata item for infobox

Mitogen-activated protein kinase kinase kinase 6 is a protein that in humans is encoded by the MAP3K6 gene.

== Function ==
This gene encodes a serine/threonine protein kinase that forms a component of protein kinase-mediated signal transduction cascades. The encoded kinase participates in the regulation of vascular endothelial growth factor (VEGF) expression. Alternative splicing results in multiple transcript variants. [provided by RefSeq, Jul 2014].
