= OR2A2 =

Protein-coding gene in the species Homo sapiens

Identifiers
- Aliases: OR2A2, OR2A17P, OR2A2P, OR7-11, OST008, olfactory receptor family 2 subfamily A member 2
- External IDs: MGI: 3030271; GeneCards: OR2A2

Gene location (Human)
Chr.	Chromosome 7 (human)
Band	7q35	Start	144,109,583 bp
Band	7q35	End	144,110,539 bp

Gene location (Mouse)
Chr.	Chromosome 6 (mouse)
Band	6|6 B2.1	Start	43,140,216 bp
Band	6|6 B2.1	End	43,146,795 bp
RNA expression pattern
Bgee	Human / Mouse (ortholog); Top expressed in: Achilles tendon; ganglionic eminence; muscle of thigh; renal cortex / Top expressed in: spermatid; More reference expression data
BioGPS	n/a
Gene ontology
Molecular function	signal transducer activity; olfactory receptor activity; G protein-coupled receptor activity
Cellular component	plasma membrane; membrane; integral component of membrane
Biological process	sensory perception of smell; signal transduction; response to stimulus; detection of chemical stimulus involved in sensory perception of smell; G protein-coupled receptor signaling pathway
Sources:Amigo / QuickGO
Orthologs
Databases	NCBI: entry; OMA: entry
Species	Human	Mouse
Entrez	442361	258293
Ensembl	ENSG00000221989; ENSG00000285071	ENSMUSG00000071481
UniProt	Q6IF42	Q8VEV1
RefSeq (mRNA)	NM_001005480	NM_146296
RefSeq (protein)	NP_001005480	NP_666408
Location (UCSC)	Chr 7: 144.11 – 144.11 Mb	Chr 6: 43.14 – 43.15 Mb
PubMed search
- Wikidata
View/Edit Human	View/Edit Mouse

Olfactory receptor 2A2 is a protein that in humans is encoded by the OR2A2 gene.

Olfactory receptors interact with odorant molecules in the nose, to initiate a neuronal response that triggers the perception of a smell. The olfactory receptor proteins are members of a large family of G-protein-coupled receptors (GPCR) arising from single coding-exon genes. Olfactory receptors share a 7-transmembrane domain structure with many neurotransmitter and hormone receptors and are responsible for the recognition and G protein-mediated transduction of odorant signals. The olfactory receptor gene family is the largest in the genome. The nomenclature assigned to the olfactory receptor genes and proteins for this organism is independent of other organisms.

== See also ==
- Olfactory receptor
