= OR2L2 =

Protein-coding gene in humans

Identifiers
- Aliases: OR2L2, HSHTPCRH07, HTPCRH07, OR1-48, OR2L12, OR2L4P, olfactory receptor family 2 subfamily L member 2
- External IDs: MGI: 3030001; GeneCards: OR2L2

Gene location (Human)
Chr.	Chromosome 1 (human)
Band	1q44	Start	248,030,070 bp
Band	1q44	End	248,042,305 bp

Gene location (Mouse)
Chr.	Chromosome 16 (mouse)
Band	16|16 A3	Start	19,328,308 bp
Band	16|16 A3	End	19,341,016 bp
RNA expression pattern
Bgee	Human / Mouse (ortholog); Top expressed in: gonad; C1 segment; prefrontal cortex; ganglionic eminence; substantia nigra; primary visual cortex; hippocampus proper; testicle; putamen; hypothalamus / n/a; More reference expression data
BioGPS	n/a
Gene ontology
Molecular function	G protein-coupled receptor activity; olfactory receptor activity; signal transducer activity; molecular function
Cellular component	integral component of membrane; plasma membrane; membrane
Biological process	sensory perception of smell; signal transduction; response to stimulus; detection of chemical stimulus involved in sensory perception of smell; G protein-coupled receptor signaling pathway; biological process
Sources:Amigo / QuickGO
Orthologs
Databases	NCBI: entry; OMA: entry
Species	Human	Mouse
Entrez	26246	258937
Ensembl	ENSG00000203663	ENSMUSG00000045341
UniProt	Q8NH16	Q8VGJ5
RefSeq (mRNA)	NM_001004686; NM_001385855	NM_146935
RefSeq (protein)	NP_001004686	NP_667146
Location (UCSC)	Chr 1: 248.03 – 248.04 Mb	Chr 16: 19.33 – 19.34 Mb
PubMed search
- Wikidata
View/Edit Human	View/Edit Mouse

Olfactory receptor 2L2 is a protein that in humans is encoded by the OR2L2 gene.

Olfactory receptors interact with odorant molecules in the nose, to initiate a neuronal response that triggers the perception of a smell. The olfactory receptor proteins are members of a large family of G-protein-coupled receptors (GPCR) arising from single coding-exon genes. Olfactory receptors share a 7-transmembrane domain structure with many neurotransmitter and hormone receptors and are responsible for the recognition and G protein-mediated transduction of odorant signals. The olfactory receptor gene family is the largest in the genome. The nomenclature assigned to the olfactory receptor genes and proteins for this organism is independent of other organisms.

== See also ==
- Olfactory receptor
