= OR2AJ1 =

Pseudogene in humans

Identifiers
- Aliases: OR2AJ1, OR2AJ1P, OR2AJ1Q, olfactory receptor family 2 subfamily AJ member 1
- External IDs: GeneCards: OR2AJ1

Gene location (Human)
Chr.	Chromosome 1 (human)
Band	1q44	Start	247,924,889 bp
Band	1q44	End	247,935,339 bp
RNA expression pattern
Bgee	Human / Mouse (ortholog); Top expressed in: superior frontal gyrus; prefrontal cortex; hippocampus proper; hypothalamus; substantia nigra / n/a; More reference expression data
BioGPS	n/a
Orthologs
Databases	NCBI: entry; OMA: entry
Species	Human	Mouse
Entrez	127608	n/a
Ensembl	ENSG00000177275	n/a
UniProt	n a	n/a
RefSeq (mRNA)	NM_001355235	n/a
RefSeq (protein)	n/a	n/a
Location (UCSC)	Chr 1: 247.92 – 247.94 Mb	n/a
PubMed search		n/a
- Wikidata
View/Edit Human

Olfactory receptor 2AJ1 is a protein that in humans is encoded by the OR2AJ1 gene.

Olfactory receptors interact with odorant molecules in the nose to initiate a neuronal response that triggers the perception of a smell. The olfactory receptor proteins are members of a large family of G-protein-coupled receptors (GPCR) arising from single coding-exon genes. Olfactory receptors share a 7-transmembrane domain structure with many neurotransmitter and hormone receptors and are responsible for the recognition and G protein-mediated transduction of odorant signals. The olfactory receptor gene family is the largest in the genome. The nomenclature assigned to the olfactory receptor genes and proteins for this organism is independent of other organisms.
