= OR4D11 =

Protein-coding gene in the species Homo sapiens

Identifiers
- Aliases: OR4D11, OR4D11P, olfactory receptor family 4 subfamily D member 11
- External IDs: MGI: 3031257; GeneCards: OR4D11

Gene location (Human)
| Chr. | Chromosome 11 (human) |
| Band | 11q12.1 | Start | 59,503,576 bp |
| Band | 11q12.1 | End | 59,504,511 bp |

Gene location (Mouse)
| Chr. | Chromosome 19 (mouse) |
| Band | 19|19 A | Start | 12,009,151 bp |
| Band | 19|19 A | End | 12,018,681 bp |
Gene ontology
| Molecular function | G protein-coupled receptor activity; olfactory receptor activity; transmembrane signaling receptor activity; signal transducer activity |
| Cellular component | integral component of membrane; plasma membrane; membrane |
| Biological process | sensory perception of smell; detection of chemical stimulus involved in sensory perception of smell; detection of chemical stimulus involved in sensory perception; signal transduction; response to stimulus; G protein-coupled receptor signaling pathway |
Sources:Amigo / QuickGO
Orthologs
| Databases | NCBI: entry; OMA: entry |
| Species | Human | Mouse |
| Entrez | 219986 | 258675 |
| Ensembl | ENSG00000176200 | ENSMUSG00000067529 |
| UniProt | Q8NGI4 | Q8VFV0 |
| RefSeq (mRNA) | NM_001004706 | NM_146680 |
| RefSeq (protein) | NP_001004706 | NP_666891 |
| Location (UCSC) | Chr 11: 59.5 – 59.5 Mb | Chr 19: 12.01 – 12.02 Mb |
| PubMed search |
- Wikidata
| View/Edit Human | View/Edit Mouse |

Olfactory receptor 4D11 is a protein that in humans is encoded by the OR4D11 gene.

Olfactory receptors interact with odorant molecules in the nose, to initiate a neuronal response that triggers the perception of a smell. The olfactory receptor proteins are members of a large family of G-protein-coupled receptors (GPCR) arising from single coding-exon genes. Olfactory receptors share a 7-transmembrane domain structure with many neurotransmitter and hormone receptors and are responsible for the recognition and G protein-mediated transduction of odorant signals. The olfactory receptor gene family is the largest in the genome. The nomenclature assigned to the olfactory receptor genes and proteins for this organism is independent of other organisms.

== See also ==
- Olfactory receptor
