= OR2AP1 =

Protein-coding gene in the species Homo sapiens

Identifiers
- Aliases: OR2AP1, OR2AP1P, olfactory receptor family 2 subfamily AP member 1
- External IDs: MGI: 3030601; GeneCards: OR2AP1

Gene location (Human)
Chr.	Chromosome 12 (human)
Band	12q13.2	Start	55,572,468 bp
Band	12q13.2	End	55,575,612 bp

Gene location (Mouse)
Chr.	Chromosome 10 (mouse)
Band	10|10 D3	Start	128,910,694 bp
Band	10|10 D3	End	128,918,779 bp
RNA expression pattern
Bgee	Human / Mouse (ortholog); Top expressed in: testicle / Top expressed in: ileum; colon; More reference expression data
BioGPS	n/a
Gene ontology
Molecular function	G protein-coupled receptor activity; olfactory receptor activity; signal transducer activity
Cellular component	integral component of membrane; plasma membrane; membrane
Biological process	sensory perception of smell; detection of chemical stimulus involved in sensory perception of smell; signal transduction; response to stimulus; G protein-coupled receptor signaling pathway
Sources:Amigo / QuickGO
Orthologs
Databases	NCBI: entry; OMA: entry
Species	Human	Mouse
Entrez	121129	258315
Ensembl	ENSG00000179615	ENSMUSG00000059762
UniProt	Q8NGE2	Q8VG33
RefSeq (mRNA)	NM_001258285	NM_146318
RefSeq (protein)	NP_001245214	NP_666430
Location (UCSC)	Chr 12: 55.57 – 55.58 Mb	Chr 10: 128.91 – 128.92 Mb
PubMed search
- Wikidata
View/Edit Human	View/Edit Mouse

Olfactory receptor 2AP1 is a protein that in humans is encoded by the OR2AP1 gene.

Olfactory receptors interact with odorant molecules in the nose, to initiate a neuronal response that triggers the perception of a smell. The olfactory receptor proteins are members of a large family of G-protein-coupled receptors (GPCR) arising from single coding-exon genes. Olfactory receptors share a 7-transmembrane domain structure with many neurotransmitter and hormone receptors and are responsible for the recognition and G protein-mediated transduction of odorant signals. The olfactory receptor gene family is the largest in the genome. The nomenclature assigned to the olfactory receptor genes and proteins for this organism is independent of other organisms.

== See also ==
- Olfactory receptor
