= MXRA7 =

Protein-coding gene in the species Homo sapiens

Identifiers
- Aliases: MXRA7, matrix remodeling associated 7
- External IDs: HomoloGene: 134006; GeneCards: MXRA7; OMA:MXRA7 - orthologs

Gene location (Human)
Chr.	Chromosome 17 (human)
Band	17q25.1	Start	76,672,551 bp
Band	17q25.1	End	76,711,004 bp
RNA expression pattern
Bgee	Human / Mouse (ortholog); Top expressed in: saphenous vein; decidua; retinal pigment epithelium; urethra; vena cava; beta cell; seminal vesicula; Epithelium of choroid plexus; skin of hip; synovial joint / n/a; More reference expression data
BioGPS	n/a
Orthologs
Species	Human	Mouse
Entrez	439921	n/a
Ensembl	ENSG00000182534	n/a
UniProt	P84157	n/a
RefSeq (mRNA)	NM_001008528; NM_001008529; NM_198530; NM_001363769; NM_001387276 NM_001387277; NM_001387278	n/a
RefSeq (protein)	NP_001008528; NP_001008529; NP_940932; NP_001350698	n/a
Location (UCSC)	Chr 17: 76.67 – 76.71 Mb	n/a
PubMed search		n/a
- Wikidata
View/Edit Human

Matrix remodeling associated 7 is a protein that in humans is encoded by the MXRA7 gene found on chromosome 17. Loss-of-function studies performed in MXRA7-deficient mice, in line with other types of data suggested that this gene was involved in multiple physiological or pathological processes.
