= Reading and autism =

Reading abilities among autistic people tend to differ from non-autistic people. Even among those without intellectual disability or comorbid disorders that could influence reading fluency, most autistic children have below-average reading ability. Severity of autistic traits is negatively correlated with reading abilities in autistic children across multiple domains.

Compared to neurotypical peers, who have a general preference for fiction text compared to nonfiction, autistic adults with normal intelligence have little preference either way. However, autistic children prefer fiction to nonfiction, with little difference from their same-aged neurotypical peers.

== Reading fluency ==
Preschool-aged children with autism tend to have better alphabet knowledge but lower print-concept knowledge and print interest compared to their typically developing peers. A majority of school-aged autistic children are impaired in terms of reading rate, although reading speed is highly variable.

Autistic children tend to have similar ability at reading words versus nonwords. In autistic adolescents without intellectual disability, automatic word recognition tends to be similar to typically-developing peers.

== Reading comprehension ==
Autistic adolescents frequently achieve disproportionately low reading comprehension test scores compared to their measured IQ. Reading comprehension in autistic people tends to be disproportionately impaired compared to other reading skills, with nearly all school-aged autistic children being at least one standard deviation below population norms in terms of comprehension ability. Autistic people also often struggle to make inferences about a text.

Some researchers attribute the discrepancy to difficulties for autistic people in applying background knowledge to ambiguities in a text. Reading comprehension difficulties may also stem from a lack of background knowledge, particularly when reading texts requiring social knowledge: Autistic people tend to struggle more with comprehending texts that require higher levels of social knowledge, and may therefore prefer nonfiction to more socially-complex fiction, although this does not account for the entirety of the reading comprehension gap. However, other research has found that autistic people do not lack the social comprehension to understand narrative texts, which often require a lot of social understanding compared to nonfiction. Other research has suggested that deficits in working memory may account for lower reading comprehension abilities among autistic people. The bottom-up processing style common in autistic people may also contribute, as many autistic people focus strongly on details but struggle to understand the bigger picture.

== Learning disabilities ==
=== Dyslexia ===
A study of adults diagnosed with Asperger's disorder found that about 14% of the sample had comorbid dyslexia. Autism and dyslexia are also both highly comorbid with attention-deficit/hyperactivity disorder (ADHD). The gene MRPL19 is associated with both autism and dyslexia, and both autistic and dyslexic brains have differences in their neuronal fibers. Both autistic and dyslexic children are also impaired in their ability to perceive global motion.

=== Hyperlexia ===
Hyperlexia is defined as word-decoding ability superior to reading-comprehensive ability. Hyperlexia and autism are commonly comorbid: 84% of people with hyperlexia are also autistic, and about up to 20% of autistic children are hyperlexic. Some researchers have suggested that hyperlexia may be a first step in a non-social language acquisition pathway.

== Therapies and tools ==
Tools developed for typically-developing young children learning to read, such as the MimioSprout Early Reading software, may also be effective for autistic children. Adaptive tools designed to simplify passages, particularly by reducing metaphors, textual ambiguities, and slang, can also improve reading comprehension in autistic adolescents and adults. Modified versions of Reread-Adapt and Answer-Comprehend (RAAC) may also help autistic people improve in reading skills, particularly in oral reading.

Reading itself can serve as a tool to help autistic people with social challenges: The social benefits of narrative texts, often assumed to only apply to neurotypical readers, also extend to autistic readers. Shared reading can also help facilitate social learning in autistic children.
