= L30 =

L30 may refer to:

- 60S ribosomal protein L30
- Albatros L 30, a German biplane
- HMS Blankney (L30), a destroyer of the Royal Navy
- Mitochondrial ribosomal protein L30
- Nissan Altima (L30), a Japanese American market-only automobile
- Royal Ordnance L30, a tank gun
- Toyota Tercel (L30), a Japanese automobile
- Zeppelin L 30, an airship of the Imperial German Navy
