= L42 =

L42 may refer to:

- HMS Brocklesby (L42), an ex-coaster taken up from trade that served in World War I for the British Royal Navy
- Lee–Enfield L42, a sniper rifle
- Mitochondrial ribosomal protein L42, a human protein
- Sako Model L42, a rifle
- Spanish landing ship Pizarro (L42)
- an engine in GM's Ecotec engine family
- a version of the Chaika L-4 amphibian aircraft
