= Mitochondrial ribosome =

Protein complex

A diagram showing mtDNA (circular) and mitochondrial ribosomes among other mitochondria structures

The mitochondrial ribosome, or mitoribosome, is a ribonucleoprotein complex that is active in mitochondria and functions as a riboprotein for translating mitochondrial mRNAs encoded in mtDNA. The mitoribosome is attached to the inner mitochondrial membrane. Mitoribosomes, like all ribosomes, consist of two subunits — large (mt-LSU) and small (mt-SSU). Mitoribosomes consist of several specific proteins and only 2 rRNAs. While mitochondrial rRNAs are encoded in the mitochondrial genome, the proteins that make up mitoribosomes are encoded in the nucleus and assembled by cytoplasmic ribosomes before being transported to the mitochondria.

== Function ==
Mitochondria need around 1000 different proteins in yeast and 1500 different proteins in humans to work. However, only 8 and 13 proteins are encoded in mitochondrial DNA in yeast and humans, respectively. So most mitochondrial proteins are encoded in the nucleus and are synthesized by cytoplasmic ribosomes. Some of the proteins that are key components in the electron transport chain are encoded and translated within mitochondria.

== Structure ==
Mammalian mitoribosomes have small 28S and large 39S subunits, together forming a 55S mitoribosome. Plant mitoribosomes have small 33S and large 50S subunits, together forming a 78S mitoribosome.

Animal mitoribosomes only have two rRNAs, 12S (SSU) and 16S (LSU), both highly minimized compared to their larger bacterial homologues. Most eukaryotes use 5S mitoribosomal RNA, animals, fungi, alveolates and euglenozoans being the exceptions. A variety of methods have evolved to fill in the gap left by a missing 5S, with animals co-opting a Mt-tRNA (Val in vertebrates).

== Comparison to other ribosomes ==
Like mitochondria itself is descended from bacteria, mitochondrial ribosomes are descended from bacterial ribosomes. As mitochondria evolved however, the mitoribosome has significantly diverged from its bacterial cousins leading to differences in configuration and function. In configuration, the mitoribosome includes additional proteins in both its large and small subunits. Below is a table showing some properties of different ribosomes:

Properties of mitoribosomes
	Bacteria	Cytosolic (Eukaryote)	Mammalian mitochondria	Yeast Mitochondria	Plant Mitochondria
Sedimentation Coefficient (LSU/SSU)	70S (50S/30S)	80S (60S/40S)	55S (39S/28S)	74S (54S/37S)	~80S
Number of proteins (LSU/SSU)	54 (33/21)	79-80 (46-47/33)	80 (50/30)	84 (46/38)	68-80
Number of rRNAs (LSU/SSU)	3 (2/1)	4 (3/1)	3 (2/1)	2 (1/1)	3 (2/1)

== Diseases ==
As the mitoribosome is responsible for the manufacture of proteins necessary for the electron transport chain, malfunctions in the mitoribosome can result in metabolic disease. In humans, disease particularly manifests in energy-reliant organs such as the heart, brain, and muscle. Disease either originates from mutations in mitochondrial rRNA or genes encoding the mitoribosomal proteins. In the case of mitoribosomal protein mutation, heredity of disease follows Mendelian inheritance as these proteins are encoded in the nucleus. On the other hand, because mitochondrial rRNA is encoded in the mitochondria, mutations in rRNA are maternally inherited. Examples of diseases in humans caused by these mutations include Leigh syndrome, deafness, neurological disorders, and various cardiomyopathies. In plants, mutation in mitoribosomal proteins can result in stunted size and distorted leaf growth.

== Genes ==
The mitochondrial ribosomal protein nomenclature generally follows that of bacteria, with extra numbers used for mitochondrion-specific proteins. (For more information on the nomenclature, see Ribosomal protein § Table of ribosomal proteins.)

- MRPS1, MRPS2, MRPS3, MRPS4, MRPS5, MRPS6, MRPS7, MRPS8, MRPS9, MRPS10, MRPS11, MRPS12, MRPS13, MRPS14, MRPS15, MRPS16, MRPS17, MRPS18, MRPS19, MRPS20, MRPS21, MRPS22, MRPS23, MRPS24, MRPS25, MRPS26, MRPS27, MRPS28, MRPS29, MRPS30, MRPS31, MRPS32, MRPS33, MRPS34, MRPS35
- MRPL1, MRPL2, MRPL3, MRPL4, MRPL5, MRPL6, MRPL7, MRPL8, MRPL9, MRPL10, MRPL11, MRPL12, MRPL13, MRPL14, MRPL15, MRPL16, MRPL17, MRPL18, MRPL19, MRPL20, MRPL21, MRPL22, MRPL23, MRPL24, MRPL25, MRPL26, MRPL27, MRPL28, MRPL29, MRPL30, MRPL31, MRPL32, MRPL33, MRPL34, MRPL35, MRPL36, MRPL37, MRPL38, MRPL39, MRPL40, MRPL41, MRPL42
- rRNA: MT-RNR1, MT-RNR2, MT-TV (mitochondrial)
