= Mitochondrial ribosomal protein L39 =

Protein-coding gene in the species Homo sapiens

MRPL39

Identifiers
- Aliases: MRPL39, C21orf92, L39mt, MRP-L5, MRPL5, PRED22, PRED66, RPML5, MSTP003, mitochondrial ribosomal protein L39, L5mt
- External IDs: OMIM: 611845; MGI: 1351620; GeneCards: MRPL39
Available structures
| PDB | Ortholog search: PDBe RCSB |
| PDB | List of PDB id codes 3J7Y, 3J9M |

Gene location (Human)
| Chr. | Chromosome 21 (human) |
| Band | 21q21.3 | Start | 25,585,656 bp |
| Band | 21q21.3 | End | 25,607,517 bp |

Gene location (Mouse)
| Chr. | Chromosome 16 (mouse) |
| Band | 16|16 C3.3 | Start | 84,514,464 bp |
| Band | 16|16 C3.3 | End | 84,532,630 bp |
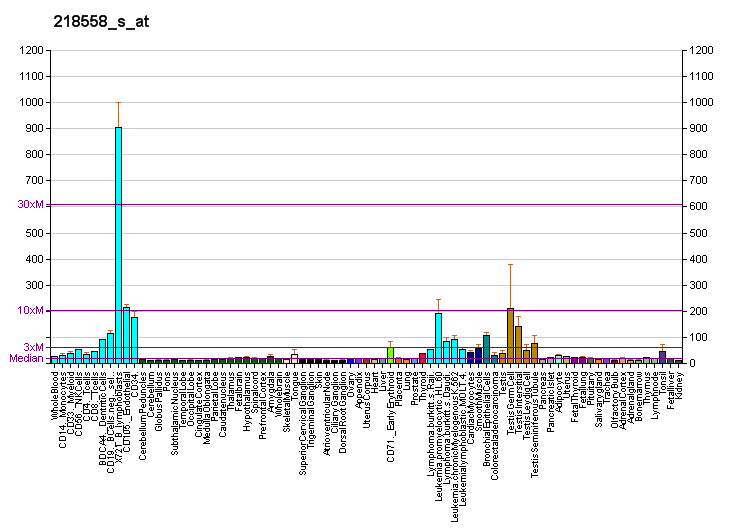
RNA expression pattern
| Bgee | Human / Mouse (ortholog); Top expressed in: oocyte; tendon of biceps brachii; left ventricle; right adrenal gland; Achilles tendon; right adrenal cortex; gastrocnemius muscle; secondary oocyte; muscle of thigh; left testis / Top expressed in: fossa; condyle; seminiferous tubule; facial motor nucleus; motor neuron; right ventricle; primitive streak; Paneth cell; medial ganglionic eminence; hair follicle; More reference expression data |
| BioGPS | More reference expression data |
Gene ontology
| Molecular function | nucleotide binding; RNA binding |
| Cellular component | mitochondrial inner membrane; ribosome; mitochondrial ribosome; mitochondrial large ribosomal subunit; mitochondrion |
| Biological process | mitochondrial translational elongation; mitochondrial translational termination |
Sources:Amigo / QuickGO
Orthologs
| Databases | NCBI: entry; OMA: entry |
| Species | Human | Mouse |
| Entrez | 54148 | 27393 |
| Ensembl | ENSG00000154719 | ENSMUSG00000022889 |
| UniProt | Q9NYK5 | Q9JKF7 |
| RefSeq (mRNA) | NM_017446; NM_080794 | NM_017404; NM_001384093; NM_001384095; NM_001384096 |
| RefSeq (protein) | NP_059142; NP_542984 | NP_059100; NP_001371022; NP_001371024; NP_001371025 |
| Location (UCSC) | Chr 21: 25.59 – 25.61 Mb | Chr 16: 84.51 – 84.53 Mb |
| PubMed search |
- Wikidata
| View/Edit Human | View/Edit Mouse |

39S ribosomal protein L39, mitochondrial is a protein that in humans is encoded by the MRPL39 gene.

Mammalian mitochondrial ribosomal proteins are encoded by nuclear genes and help in protein synthesis within the mitochondrion. Mitochondrial ribosomes (mitoribosomes) consist of a small 28S subunit and a large 39S subunit. They have an estimated 75% protein to rRNA composition compared to prokaryotic ribosomes, where this ratio is reversed. Another difference between mammalian mitoribosomes and prokaryotic ribosomes is that the latter contain a 5S rRNA. Among different species, the proteins comprising the mitoribosome differ greatly in sequence, and sometimes in biochemical properties, which prevents easy recognition by sequence homology. This gene encodes a 39S subunit protein. Two transcript variants encoding distinct isoforms have been described. A pseudogene corresponding to this gene is found on chromosome 5q.
