= Mitochondrial ribosomal protein L32 =

Protein-coding gene in the species Homo sapiens

MRPL32

Identifiers
- Aliases: MRPL32, L32mt, MRP-L32, bMRP-59b, HSPC283, mitochondrial ribosomal protein L32
- External IDs: OMIM: 611839; MGI: 2137226; GeneCards: MRPL32
Available structures
PDB	Ortholog search: PDBe RCSB
PDB	List of PDB id codes 3J7Y, 3J9M

Gene location (Human)
Chr.	Chromosome 7 (human)
Band	7p14.1	Start	42,932,376 bp
Band	7p14.1	End	42,948,958 bp

Gene location (Mouse)
Chr.	Chromosome 13 (mouse)
Band	13|13 A1	Start	14,782,769 bp
Band	13|13 A1	End	14,787,750 bp
RNA expression pattern
Bgee	Human / Mouse (ortholog); Top expressed in: oocyte; myocardium of left ventricle; cardia; pancreatic epithelial cell; right ventricle; renal medulla; pylorus; cardiac muscle tissue of right atrium; left adrenal gland; metanephros / Top expressed in: interventricular septum; medial ganglionic eminence; migratory enteric neural crest cell; atrioventricular valve; olfactory epithelium; endocardial cushion; myocardium of ventricle; abdominal wall; soleus muscle; intercostal muscle; More reference expression data
BioGPS	n/a
Gene ontology
Molecular function	structural constituent of ribosome; RNA binding
Cellular component	mitochondrial inner membrane; large ribosomal subunit; ribosome; mitochondrial ribosome; mitochondrion; mitochondrial large ribosomal subunit
Biological process	mitochondrial translational elongation; mitochondrial translational termination; protein biosynthesis
Sources:Amigo / QuickGO
Orthologs
Databases	NCBI: entry; OMA: entry
Species	Human	Mouse
Entrez	64983	75398
Ensembl	ENSG00000106591	ENSMUSG00000015672
UniProt	Q9BYC8	Q9DCI9
RefSeq (mRNA)	NM_031903	NM_029271
RefSeq (protein)	NP_114109	NP_083547
Location (UCSC)	Chr 7: 42.93 – 42.95 Mb	Chr 13: 14.78 – 14.79 Mb
PubMed search
- Wikidata
View/Edit Human	View/Edit Mouse

39S ribosomal protein L32, mitochondrial is a protein that in humans is encoded by the MRPL32 gene.

Mammalian mitochondrial ribosomal proteins are encoded by nuclear genes and help in protein synthesis within the mitochondrion. Mitochondrial ribosomes (mitoribosomes) consist of a small 28S subunit and a large 39S subunit. They have an estimated 75% protein to rRNA composition compared to prokaryotic ribosomes, where this ratio is reversed. Another difference between mammalian mitoribosomes and prokaryotic ribosomes is that the latter contain a 5S rRNA. Among different species, the proteins comprising the mitoribosome differ greatly in sequence, and sometimes in biochemical properties, which prevents easy recognition by sequence homology. This gene encodes a 39S subunit protein that belongs to the L32 ribosomal protein family. A pseudogene corresponding to this gene is found on chromosome Xp.
