= Mitochondrial ribosomal protein S2 =

Protein-coding gene in the species Homo sapiens

MRPS2

Identifiers
- Aliases: MRPS2, MRP-S2, S2mt, CGI-91, mitochondrial ribosomal protein S2, COXPD36
- External IDs: OMIM: 611971; MGI: 2153089; GeneCards: MRPS2
Available structures
PDB	Ortholog search: PDBe RCSB
PDB	List of PDB id codes 3J9M

Gene location (Human)
Chr.	Chromosome 9 (human)
Band	9q34.3	Start	135,499,965 bp
Band	9q34.3	End	135,505,141 bp

Gene location (Mouse)
Chr.	Chromosome 2 (mouse)
Band	2|2 A3	Start	28,358,078 bp
Band	2|2 A3	End	28,361,190 bp
RNA expression pattern
Bgee	Human / Mouse (ortholog); Top expressed in: apex of heart; right adrenal gland; right adrenal cortex; mucosa of transverse colon; right lobe of liver; left adrenal gland; right uterine tube; gastrocnemius muscle; left adrenal cortex; left ventricle / Top expressed in: primitive streak; abdominal wall; mandibular prominence; maxillary prominence; tail of embryo; endocardial cushion; epiblast; migratory enteric neural crest cell; genital tubercle; proximal tubule; More reference expression data
BioGPS	n/a
Gene ontology
Molecular function	structural constituent of ribosome
Cellular component	small ribosomal subunit; ribosome; intracellular anatomical structure; mitochondrion; mitochondrial inner membrane; mitochondrial small ribosomal subunit
Biological process	protein biosynthesis; mitochondrial translation; mitochondrial translational elongation; mitochondrial translational termination; mitochondrial ribosome assembly
Sources:Amigo / QuickGO
Orthologs
Databases	NCBI: entry; OMA: entry
Species	Human	Mouse
Entrez	51116	118451
Ensembl	ENSG00000122140	ENSMUSG00000035772
UniProt	Q9Y399	Q924T2
RefSeq (mRNA)	NM_016034; NM_001371401	NM_001166031; NM_080452
RefSeq (protein)	NP_057118; NP_001358330	NP_001159503; NP_536700
Location (UCSC)	Chr 9: 135.5 – 135.51 Mb	Chr 2: 28.36 – 28.36 Mb
PubMed search
- Wikidata
View/Edit Human	View/Edit Mouse

Mitochondrial ribosomal protein S2 (MRPS2), otherwise known as uS2m, is a protein that in humans is encoded by the MRPS2 gene.

== Function ==
Mammalian mitochondrial ribosomal proteins are encoded by nuclear genes and help in protein synthesis within the mitochondrion. Mitochondrial ribosomes (mitoribosomes) consist of a small 28S subunit and a large 39S subunit. They have an estimated 75% protein to rRNA composition compared to prokaryotic ribosomes, where this ratio is reversed. Another difference between mammalian mitoribosomes and prokaryotic ribosomes is that the latter contain a 5S rRNA. Among different species, the proteins comprising the mitoribosome differ greatly in sequence, and sometimes in biochemical properties, which prevents easy recognition by sequence homology. This gene encodes a 28S subunit protein that belongs to the ribosomal protein S2 family. Alternatively spliced transcript variants have been observed for this gene. [provided by RefSeq, May 2012].

== See also ==
- Mitochondrial ribosome
