= Mitochondrial ribosomal protein L11 =

Protein-coding gene in the species Homo sapiens

MRPL11
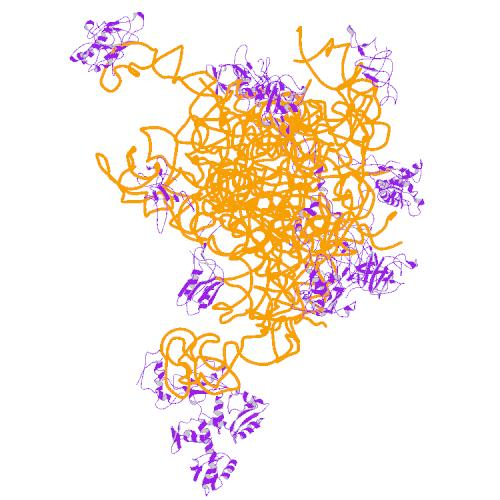

Identifiers
- Aliases: MRPL11, L11MT, MRP-L11, CGI-113, mitochondrial ribosomal protein L11
- External IDs: OMIM: 611826; MGI: 2137215; GeneCards: MRPL11
Available structures
PDB	Ortholog search: PDBe RCSB
PDB	List of PDB id codes 3J7Y, 3J9M

Gene location (Human)
Chr.	Chromosome 11 (human)
Band	11q13.2	Start	66,435,075 bp
Band	11q13.2	End	66,466,738 bp

Gene location (Mouse)
Chr.	Chromosome 19 (mouse)
Band	19|19 A	Start	5,012,175 bp
Band	19|19 A	End	5,017,027 bp
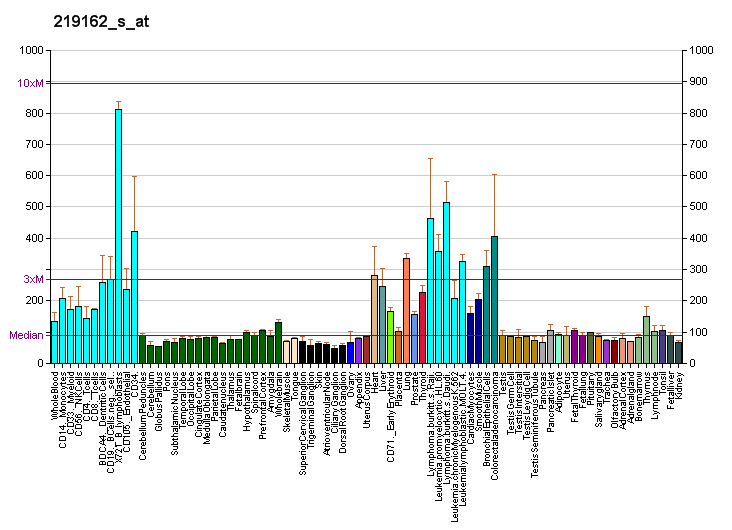
RNA expression pattern
Bgee	Human / Mouse (ortholog); Top expressed in: mucosa of transverse colon; muscle of thigh; apex of heart; gastrocnemius muscle; muscle layer of sigmoid colon; right lobe of liver; rectum; right auricle of heart; left ventricle; body of stomach / Top expressed in: condyle; fossa; motor neuron; Paneth cell; primitive streak; internal carotid artery; external carotid artery; ascending aorta; aortic valve; medial ganglionic eminence; More reference expression data
BioGPS	More reference expression data
Gene ontology
Molecular function	rRNA binding; protein binding; structural constituent of ribosome; RNA binding; large ribosomal subunit rRNA binding
Cellular component	mitochondrial inner membrane; ribosome; mitochondrial ribosome; mitochondrion; mitochondrial large ribosomal subunit; large ribosomal subunit
Biological process	mitochondrial translational elongation; mitochondrial translational termination; ribosomal large subunit assembly; protein biosynthesis
Sources:Amigo / QuickGO
Orthologs
Databases	NCBI: entry; OMA: entry
Species	Human	Mouse
Entrez	65003	66419
Ensembl	ENSG00000174547	ENSMUSG00000024902
UniProt	Q9Y3B7	Q9CQF0
RefSeq (mRNA)	NM_016050; NM_170738; NM_170739	NM_025553
RefSeq (protein)	NP_057134; NP_733934; NP_733935	NP_079829
Location (UCSC)	Chr 11: 66.44 – 66.47 Mb	Chr 19: 5.01 – 5.02 Mb
PubMed search
- Wikidata
View/Edit Human	View/Edit Mouse

39S ribosomal protein L11, mitochondrial is a protein that in humans is encoded by the MRPL11 gene.

Mammalian mitochondrial ribosomal proteins are encoded by nuclear genes and help in protein synthesis within the mitochondrion. Mitochondrial ribosomes (mitoribosomes) consist of a small 28S subunit and a large 39S subunit. They have an estimated 75% protein to rRNA composition compared to prokaryotic ribosomes, where this ratio is reversed. Another difference between mammalian mitoribosomes and prokaryotic ribosomes is that the latter contain a 5S rRNA. Among different species, the proteins comprising the mitoribosome differ greatly in sequence, and sometimes in biochemical properties, which prevents easy recognition by sequence homology. This gene encodes a 39S subunit protein. Sequence analysis identified three transcript variants that encode different isoforms. Pseudogenes corresponding to this gene are found on chromosomes 5q and 12q.
