= Mitochondrial ribosomal protein S24 =

Protein-coding gene in the species Homo sapiens

MRPS24

Identifiers
- Aliases: MRPS24, MRP-S24, S24mt, bMRP-47, bMRP47, HSPC335, mitochondrial ribosomal protein S24
- External IDs: OMIM: 611986; MGI: 1928142; GeneCards: MRPS24
Available structures
PDB	Ortholog search: PDBe RCSB
PDB	List of PDB id codes 3J9M

Gene location (Human)
Chr.	Chromosome 7 (human)
Band	7p13	Start	43,866,558 bp
Band	7p13	End	43,869,893 bp

Gene location (Mouse)
Chr.	Chromosome 11 (mouse)
Band	11|11 A1	Start	5,653,983 bp
Band	11|11 A1	End	5,665,680 bp
RNA expression pattern
Bgee	Human / Mouse (ortholog); Top expressed in: gastrocnemius muscle; muscle of thigh; apex of heart; left ventricle; right adrenal gland; body of pancreas; left adrenal cortex; right adrenal cortex; right auricle of heart; mucosa of transverse colon / Top expressed in: endocardial cushion; lacrimal gland; medullary collecting duct; renal corpuscle; atrioventricular valve; facial motor nucleus; intercostal muscle; Paneth cell; epithelium of stomach; internal carotid artery; More reference expression data
BioGPS	n/a
Gene ontology
Molecular function	structural constituent of ribosome; RNA binding
Cellular component	mitochondrial inner membrane; ribosome; mitochondrial ribosome; mitochondrion; mitochondrial small ribosomal subunit
Biological process	mitochondrial translational elongation; mitochondrial translational termination; protein biosynthesis; mitochondrial translation; biological process
Sources:Amigo / QuickGO
Orthologs
Databases	NCBI: entry; OMA: entry
Species	Human	Mouse
Entrez	64951	64660
Ensembl	ENSG00000062582	ENSMUSG00000020477
UniProt	Q96EL2	Q9CQV5
RefSeq (mRNA)	NM_032014	NM_026080; NM_001362871
RefSeq (protein)	NP_114403	NP_080356; NP_001349800
Location (UCSC)	Chr 7: 43.87 – 43.87 Mb	Chr 11: 5.65 – 5.67 Mb
PubMed search
- Wikidata
View/Edit Human	View/Edit Mouse

28S ribosomal protein S24, mitochondrial is a protein that in humans is encoded by the MRPS24 gene.

Mammalian mitochondrial ribosomal proteins are encoded by nuclear genes and help in protein synthesis within the mitochondrion. Mitochondrial ribosomes (mitoribosomes) consist of a small 28S subunit and a large 39S subunit. They have an estimated 75% protein to rRNA composition compared to prokaryotic ribosomes, where this ratio is reversed. Another difference between mammalian mitoribosomes and prokaryotic ribosomes is that the latter contain a 5S rRNA. Among different species, the proteins comprising the mitoribosome differ greatly in sequence, and sometimes in biochemical properties, which prevents easy recognition by sequence homology. This gene encodes a 28S subunit protein. A pseudogene corresponding to this gene is found on chromosome 11.
