= Mitochondrial ribosomal protein L20 =

Protein found in humans

MRPL20
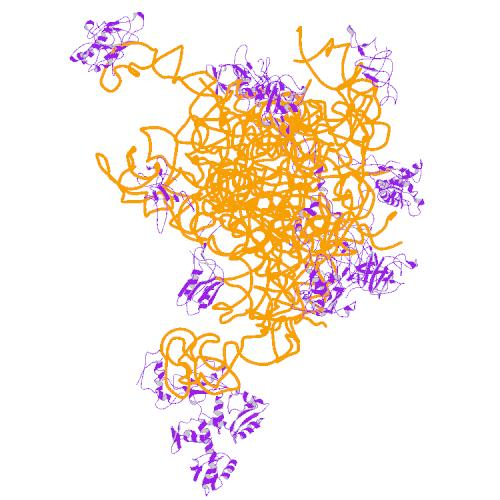

Identifiers
- Aliases: MRPL20, L20mt, MRP-L20, mitochondrial ribosomal protein L20
- External IDs: OMIM: 611833; MGI: 2137221; GeneCards: MRPL20
Available structures
PDB	Ortholog search: PDBe RCSB
PDB	List of PDB id codes 3J7Y, 3J9M

Gene location (Human)
Chr.	Chromosome 1 (human)
Band	1p36.33	Start	1,401,909 bp
Band	1p36.33	End	1,407,293 bp

Gene location (Mouse)
Chr.	Chromosome 4 (mouse)
Band	4 E2|4 87.44 cM	Start	155,887,335 bp
Band	4 E2|4 87.44 cM	End	155,894,432 bp
RNA expression pattern
Bgee	Human / Mouse (ortholog); Top expressed in: palpebral conjunctiva; epithelium of nasopharynx; germinal epithelium; gingival epithelium; Skeletal muscle tissue of rectus abdominis; muscle of thigh; amniotic fluid; corpus epididymis; mucosa of paranasal sinus; Skeletal muscle tissue of biceps brachii / Top expressed in: gastrula; right kidney; embryo; embryo; spermatocyte; spermatid; morula; epiblast; submandibular gland; neural tube; More reference expression data
BioGPS	n/a
Gene ontology
Molecular function	rRNA binding; protein binding; RNA binding; structural constituent of ribosome
Cellular component	mitochondrial inner membrane; ribosome; intracellular anatomical structure; mitochondrial ribosome; mitochondrion; mitochondrial large ribosomal subunit
Biological process	mitochondrial translational elongation; mitochondrial translational termination; protein biosynthesis; ribosomal large subunit assembly
Sources:Amigo / QuickGO
Orthologs
Databases	NCBI: entry; OMA: entry
Species	Human	Mouse
Entrez	55052	66448
Ensembl	ENSG00000242485	ENSMUSG00000029066
UniProt	Q9BYC9	Q9CQL4
RefSeq (mRNA)	NM_017971; NM_001318485	NM_025570
RefSeq (protein)	NP_001305414; NP_060441	NP_079846
Location (UCSC)	Chr 1: 1.4 – 1.41 Mb	Chr 4: 155.89 – 155.89 Mb
PubMed search
- Wikidata
View/Edit Human	View/Edit Mouse

39S ribosomal protein L20, mitochondrial is a protein that in humans is encoded by the MRPL20 gene.

Mammalian mitochondrial ribosomal proteins are encoded by nuclear genes and help in protein synthesis within the mitochondrion. Mitochondrial ribosomes (mitoribosomes) consist of a small 28S subunit and a large 39S subunit. They have an estimated 75% protein to rRNA composition compared to prokaryotic ribosomes, where this ratio is reversed. Another difference between mammalian mitoribosomes and prokaryotic ribosomes is that the latter contain a 5S rRNA. Among different species, the proteins comprising the mitoribosome differ greatly in sequence, and sometimes in biochemical properties, which prevents easy recognition by sequence homology. This gene encodes a 39S subunit protein. A pseudogene corresponding to this gene is found on chromosome 21q.
