= Mitochondrial ribosomal protein S25 =

Protein-coding gene in the species Homo sapiens

MRPS25

Identifiers
- Aliases: MRPS25, MRP-S25, RPMS25, mitochondrial ribosomal protein S25, COXPD50
- External IDs: OMIM: 611987; MGI: 1928140; GeneCards: MRPS25
Available structures
| PDB | Ortholog search: PDBe RCSB |
| PDB | List of PDB id codes 3J9M |

Gene location (Human)
| Chr. | Chromosome 3 (human) |
| Band | 3p25.1 | Start | 15,009,611 bp |
| Band | 3p25.1 | End | 15,065,339 bp |

Gene location (Mouse)
| Chr. | Chromosome 6 (mouse) |
| Band | 6|6 D1 | Start | 92,146,506 bp |
| Band | 6|6 D1 | End | 92,161,014 bp |
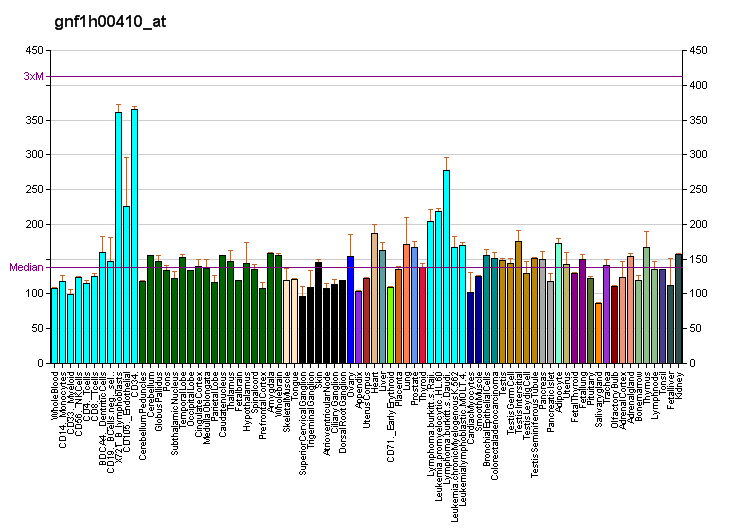
RNA expression pattern
| Bgee | Human / Mouse (ortholog); Top expressed in: apex of heart; pancreatic ductal cell; right lobe of thyroid gland; myocardium of left ventricle; left lobe of thyroid gland; cerebellar hemisphere; right hemisphere of cerebellum; anterior pituitary; gastrocnemius muscle; muscle of thigh / Top expressed in: Ileal epithelium; primary oocyte; dentate gyrus of hippocampal formation granule cell; embryo; otic placode; cardiac muscle tissue of left ventricle; embryo; yolk sac; epiblast; blastocyst; More reference expression data |
| BioGPS | More reference expression data |
Gene ontology
| Molecular function | structural constituent of ribosome |
| Cellular component | ribosome; mitochondrion; mitochondrial inner membrane |
| Biological process | mitochondrial translational elongation; mitochondrial translational termination |
Sources:Amigo / QuickGO
Orthologs
| Databases | NCBI: entry; OMA: entry |
| Species | Human | Mouse |
| Entrez | 64432 | 64658 |
| Ensembl | ENSG00000131368 | ENSMUSG00000014551 |
| UniProt | P82663 | Q9D125 |
| RefSeq (mRNA) | NM_022497 | NM_025578 |
| RefSeq (protein) | NP_071942 | NP_079854 |
| Location (UCSC) | Chr 3: 15.01 – 15.07 Mb | Chr 6: 92.15 – 92.16 Mb |
| PubMed search |
- Wikidata
| View/Edit Human | View/Edit Mouse |

28S ribosomal protein S25, mitochondrial is a protein that in humans is encoded by the MRPS25 gene.

Mammalian mitochondrial ribosomal proteins are encoded by nuclear genes and help in protein synthesis within the mitochondrion. Mitochondrial ribosomes (mitoribosomes) consist of a small 28S subunit and a large 39S subunit. They have an estimated 75% protein to rRNA composition compared to prokaryotic ribosomes, where this ratio is reversed. Another difference between mammalian mitoribosomes and prokaryotic ribosomes is that the latter contain a 5S rRNA. Among different species, the proteins comprising the mitoribosome differ greatly in sequence, and sometimes in biochemical properties, which prevents easy recognition by sequence homology. This gene encodes a 28S subunit protein. A pseudogene corresponding to this gene is found on chromosome 4.
