= Mitochondrial ribosomal protein S35 =

Protein-coding gene in the species Homo sapiens

MRPS35

Identifiers
- Aliases: MRPS35, MDS023, MRP-S28, MRPS28, HDCMD11P, mitochondrial ribosomal protein S35
- External IDs: OMIM: 611995; MGI: 2385255; GeneCards: MRPS35
Available structures
PDB	Ortholog search: PDBe RCSB
PDB	List of PDB id codes 3J9M

Gene location (Human)
Chr.	Chromosome 12 (human)
Band	12p11.22	Start	27,710,822 bp
Band	12p11.22	End	27,756,295 bp

Gene location (Mouse)
Chr.	Chromosome 6 (mouse)
Band	6|6 G3	Start	146,944,262 bp
Band	6|6 G3	End	146,975,489 bp
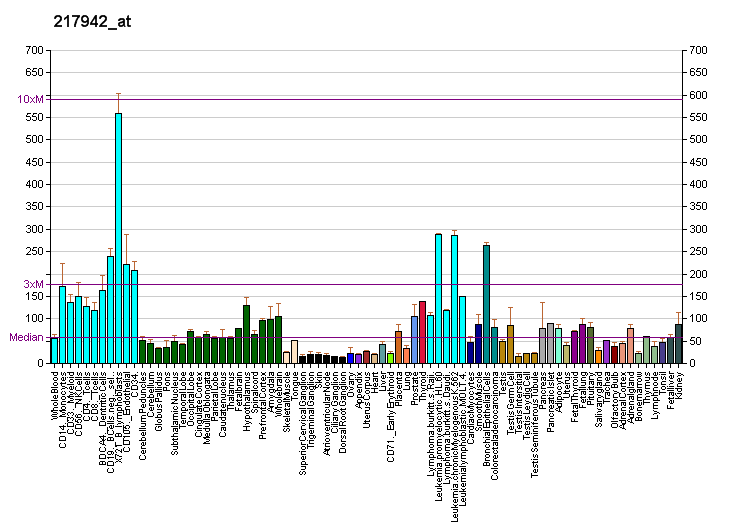
RNA expression pattern
Bgee	Human / Mouse (ortholog); Top expressed in: rectum; mucosa of transverse colon; Achilles tendon; tibialis anterior muscle; gastrocnemius muscle; mucosa of ileum; deltoid muscle; Skeletal muscle tissue of rectus abdominis; right adrenal gland; right adrenal cortex / Top expressed in: interventricular septum; right kidney; embryo; embryo; right ventricle; myocardium of ventricle; ventricular zone; proximal tubule; epiblast; muscle of thigh; More reference expression data
BioGPS	More reference expression data
Gene ontology
Molecular function	structural constituent of ribosome; RNA binding
Cellular component	mitochondrial inner membrane; ribosome; mitochondrial small ribosomal subunit; mitochondrion
Biological process	mitochondrial translational elongation; mitochondrial translational termination; mitochondrial translation
Sources:Amigo / QuickGO
Orthologs
Databases	NCBI: entry; OMA: entry
Species	Human	Mouse
Entrez	60488	232536
Ensembl	ENSG00000061794	ENSMUSG00000040112
UniProt	P82673	Q8BJZ4
RefSeq (mRNA)	NM_021821; NM_001190864	NM_145573
RefSeq (protein)	NP_001177793; NP_068593	NP_663548
Location (UCSC)	Chr 12: 27.71 – 27.76 Mb	Chr 6: 146.94 – 146.98 Mb
PubMed search
- Wikidata
View/Edit Human	View/Edit Mouse

28S ribosomal protein S35, mitochondrial is a protein that in humans is encoded by the MRPS35 gene.

Mammalian mitochondrial ribosomal proteins are encoded by nuclear genes and help in protein synthesis within the mitochondrion. Mitochondrial ribosomes (mitoribosomes) consist of a small 28S subunit and a large 39S subunit. They have an estimated 75% protein to rRNA composition compared to prokaryotic ribosomes, where this ratio is reversed. Another difference between mammalian mitoribosomes and prokaryotic ribosomes is that the latter contain a 5S rRNA. Among different species, the proteins comprising the mitoribosome differ greatly in sequence, and sometimes in biochemical properties, which prevents easy recognition by sequence homology. This gene encodes a 28S subunit protein that has had confusing nomenclature in the literature. Pseudogenes corresponding to this gene are found on chromosomes 3p, 5q, and 10q.
