= Mitochondrial ribosomal protein L17 =

Protein-coding gene in the species Homo sapiens

MRPL17
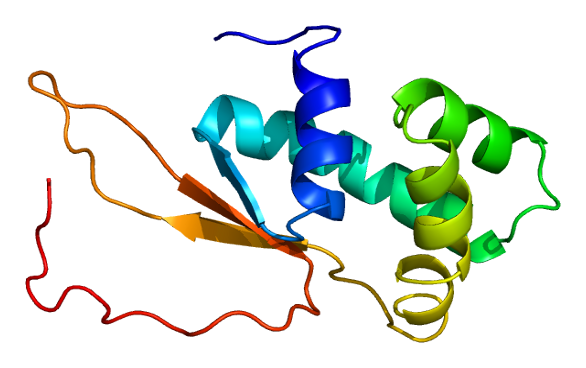

Identifiers
- Aliases: MRPL17, L17mt, LIP2, MRP-L17, MRP-L26, RPL17L, RPML26, mitochondrial ribosomal protein L17
- External IDs: OMIM: 611830; MGI: 1351608; GeneCards: MRPL17
Available structures
PDB	Ortholog search: PDBe RCSB
PDB	List of PDB id codes 2CQM, 3J7Y, 3J9M

Gene location (Human)
Chr.	Chromosome 11 (human)
Band	11p15.4	Start	6,680,385 bp
Band	11p15.4	End	6,683,340 bp

Gene location (Mouse)
Chr.	Chromosome 7 (mouse)
Band	7|7 E3	Start	105,452,413 bp
Band	7|7 E3	End	105,460,306 bp
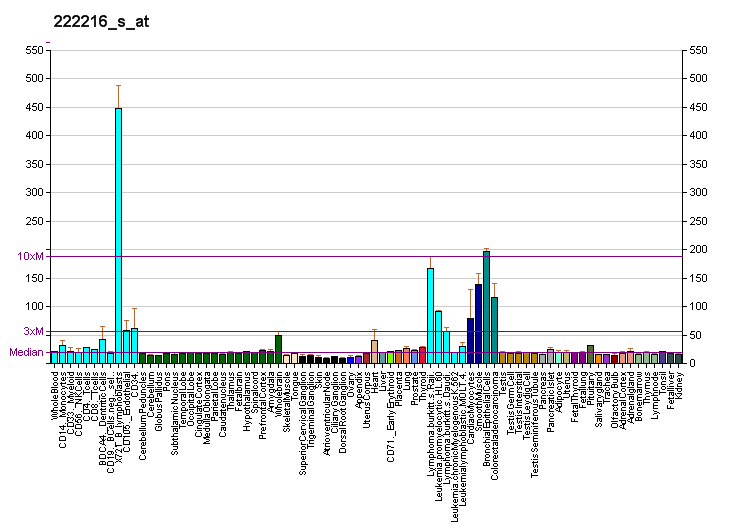
RNA expression pattern
Bgee	Human / Mouse (ortholog); Top expressed in: stromal cell of endometrium; apex of heart; anterior pituitary; left adrenal gland; right ventricle; right adrenal gland; left adrenal cortex; gonad; right adrenal cortex; muscle of thigh / Top expressed in: blastocyst; embryo; embryo; yolk sac; morula; right kidney; otic placode; lip; muscle of thigh; epiblast; More reference expression data
BioGPS	More reference expression data
Gene ontology
Molecular function	structural constituent of ribosome; protein domain specific binding
Cellular component	ribosome; intracellular anatomical structure; mitochondrion; mitochondrial large ribosomal subunit; mitochondrial inner membrane
Biological process	mitochondrial translational elongation; mitochondrial translational termination; protein biosynthesis; mitochondrial genome maintenance
Sources:Amigo / QuickGO
Orthologs
Databases	NCBI: entry; OMA: entry
Species	Human	Mouse
Entrez	63875	27397
Ensembl	ENSG00000158042	ENSMUSG00000030879
UniProt	Q9NRX2	Q9D8P4
RefSeq (mRNA)	NM_022061	NM_025301
RefSeq (protein)	NP_071344	NP_079577
Location (UCSC)	Chr 11: 6.68 – 6.68 Mb	Chr 7: 105.45 – 105.46 Mb
PubMed search
- Wikidata
View/Edit Human	View/Edit Mouse

39S ribosomal protein L17, mitochondrial is a protein that in humans is encoded by the MRPL17 gene.

Mammalian mitochondrial ribosomal proteins are encoded by nuclear genes and help in protein synthesis within the mitochondrion. Mitochondrial ribosomes (mitoribosomes) consist of a small 28S subunit and a large 39S subunit. They have an estimated 75% protein to rRNA composition compared to prokaryotic ribosomes, where this ratio is reversed. Another difference between mammalian mitoribosomes and prokaryotic ribosomes is that the latter contain a 5S rRNA. Among different species, the proteins comprising the mitoribosome differ greatly in sequence, and sometimes in biochemical properties, which prevents easy recognition by sequence homology. This gene encodes a 39S subunit protein.
