= Mitochondrial ribosomal protein L13 =

Protein-coding gene in the species Homo sapiens

MRPL13

Identifiers
- Aliases: MRPL13, L13, L13A, L13mt, RPL13, RPML13, mitochondrial ribosomal protein L13
- External IDs: OMIM: 610200; MGI: 2137218; GeneCards: MRPL13
Available structures
PDB	Ortholog search: PDBe RCSB
PDB	List of PDB id codes 3J7Y, 3J9M

Gene location (Human)
Chr.	Chromosome 8 (human)
Band	8q24.12	Start	120,380,761 bp
Band	8q24.12	End	120,445,402 bp

Gene location (Mouse)
Chr.	Chromosome 15 (mouse)
Band	15|15 D1	Start	55,397,490 bp
Band	15|15 D1	End	55,421,144 bp
RNA expression pattern
Bgee	Human / Mouse (ortholog); Top expressed in: mucosa of transverse colon; ganglionic eminence; ventricular zone; right adrenal gland; right adrenal cortex; islet of Langerhans; rectum; stromal cell of endometrium; left adrenal gland; left adrenal cortex / Top expressed in: medial ganglionic eminence; maxillary prominence; mandibular prominence; intercostal muscle; Gonadal ridge; external carotid artery; internal carotid artery; right ventricle; fetal liver hematopoietic progenitor cell; digastric muscle; More reference expression data
BioGPS	n/a
Gene ontology
Molecular function	structural constituent of ribosome; protein binding; mRNA binding; RNA binding
Cellular component	mitochondrial inner membrane; ribosome; mitochondrial ribosome; mitochondrion; mitochondrial large ribosomal subunit
Biological process	mitochondrial translational elongation; mitochondrial translational termination; protein biosynthesis; negative regulation of translation
Sources:Amigo / QuickGO
Orthologs
Databases	NCBI: entry; OMA: entry
Species	Human	Mouse
Entrez	28998	68537
Ensembl	ENSG00000172172	ENSMUSG00000022370
UniProt	Q9BYD1	Q9D1P0
RefSeq (mRNA)	NM_014078	NM_026759
RefSeq (protein)	NP_054797	NP_081035
Location (UCSC)	Chr 8: 120.38 – 120.45 Mb	Chr 15: 55.4 – 55.42 Mb
PubMed search
- Wikidata
View/Edit Human	View/Edit Mouse

Mitochondrial ribosomal protein L13 is a protein that in humans is encoded by the MRPL13 gene.

== Function ==
Mammalian mitochondrial ribosomal proteins are encoded by nuclear genes and play a crucial role in protein synthesis within the mitochondrion. Mitochondrial ribosomes (mitoribosomes) are composed of a small 28S subunit and a large 39S subunit, with an estimated protein to rRNA composition of 75% with contrasts with prokaryotic ribosomes, where this ratio is reversed. Another distinction between mammalian mitoribosomes and prokaryotic ribosomes is that the latter includes a 5S rRNA. The proteins that make up the mitoribosome vary significantly in sequence, and sometimes in biochemical properties across different species, which prevents easy recognition by sequence homology. This gene encodes a 39S subunit protein.
