= Mitochondrial ribosomal protein L41 =

Protein-coding gene in the species Homo sapiens

MRPL41

Identifiers
- Aliases: MRPL41, BMRP, MRP-L27, MRPL27, RPML27, PIG3, Mitochondrial ribosomal protein L41
- External IDs: OMIM: 611846; MGI: 1333816; GeneCards: MRPL41
Available structures
PDB	Ortholog search: PDBe RCSB
PDB	List of PDB id codes 3J7Y, 3J9M

Gene location (Human)
Chr.	Chromosome 9 (human)
Band	9q34.3	Start	137,551,879 bp
Band	9q34.3	End	137,552,555 bp

Gene location (Mouse)
Chr.	Chromosome 2 (mouse)
Band	2|2 A3	Start	24,864,129 bp
Band	2|2 A3	End	24,865,110 bp
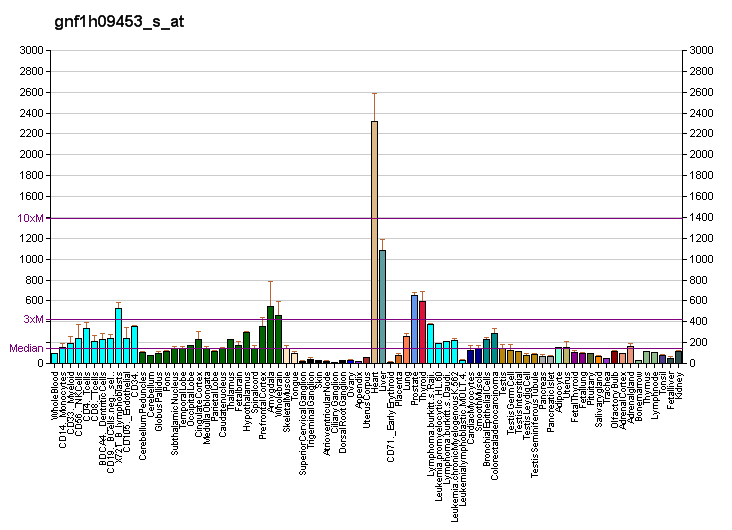

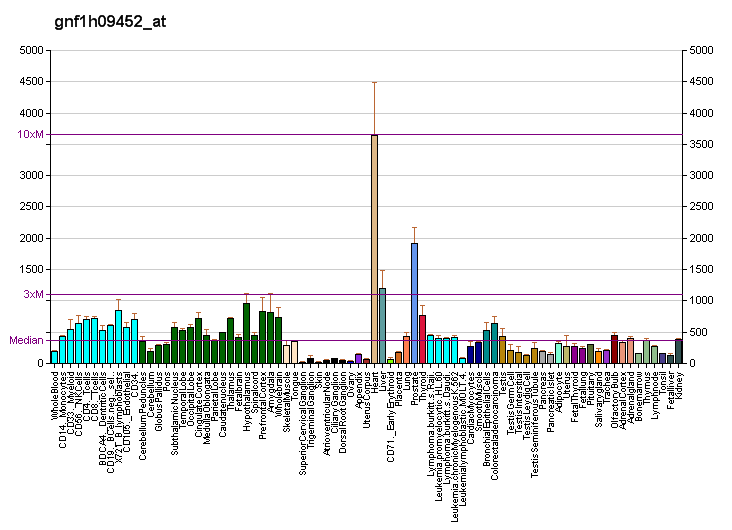
RNA expression pattern
Bgee	Human / Mouse (ortholog); Top expressed in: apex of heart; myocardium of left ventricle; right auricle of heart; right ventricle; mucosa of transverse colon; cingulate gyrus; anterior cingulate cortex; caudate nucleus; putamen; muscle of thigh / Top expressed in: facial motor nucleus; fossa; condyle; motor neuron; epithelium of lens; endocardial cushion; external carotid artery; internal carotid artery; renal corpuscle; atrioventricular junction; More reference expression data
BioGPS	More reference expression data
Gene ontology
Molecular function	structural constituent of ribosome; protein binding; RNA binding
Cellular component	mitochondrial inner membrane; ribosome; mitochondrion; mitochondrial large ribosomal subunit; ribonucleoprotein complex
Biological process	cell cycle; mitochondrial translational elongation; mitochondrial translational termination; protein biosynthesis; apoptotic process
Sources:Amigo / QuickGO
Orthologs
Databases	NCBI: entry; OMA: entry
Species	Human	Mouse
Entrez	64975	107733
Ensembl	ENSG00000182154	ENSMUSG00000036850
UniProt	Q8IXM3	Q9CQN7
RefSeq (mRNA)	NM_032477	NM_001031808
RefSeq (protein)	NP_115866	NP_001026978
Location (UCSC)	Chr 9: 137.55 – 137.55 Mb	Chr 2: 24.86 – 24.87 Mb
PubMed search
- Wikidata
View/Edit Human	View/Edit Mouse

39S ribosomal protein L41, mitochondrial is a protein that in humans is encoded by the MRPL41 gene.

Mammalian mitochondrial ribosomal proteins are encoded by nuclear genes and help in protein synthesis within the mitochondrion. Mitochondrial ribosomes (mitoribosomes) consist of a small 28S subunit and a large 39S subunit. They have an estimated 75% protein to rRNA composition compared to prokaryotic ribosomes, where this ratio is reversed. Another difference between mammalian mitoribosomes and prokaryotic ribosomes is that the latter contain a 5S rRNA. Among different species, the proteins comprising the mitoribosome differ greatly in sequence, and sometimes in biochemical properties, which prevents easy recognition by sequence homology. This gene encodes a 39S subunit protein that belongs to the YmL27 ribosomal protein family.
