= Mitochondrial ribosomal protein L15 =

Protein-coding gene in the species Homo sapiens

MRPL15

Identifiers
- Aliases: MRPL15, L15mt, MRP-L15, MRP-L7, RPML7, HSPC145, mitochondrial ribosomal protein L15
- External IDs: OMIM: 611828; MGI: 1351639; GeneCards: MRPL15
Available structures
PDB	Ortholog search: PDBe RCSB
PDB	List of PDB id codes 3J7Y, 3J9M

Gene location (Human)
Chr.	Chromosome 8 (human)
Band	8q11.23	Start	54,135,241 bp
Band	8q11.23	End	54,148,514 bp

Gene location (Mouse)
Chr.	Chromosome 1 (mouse)
Band	1|1 A1	Start	4,843,429 bp
Band	1|1 A1	End	4,855,962 bp
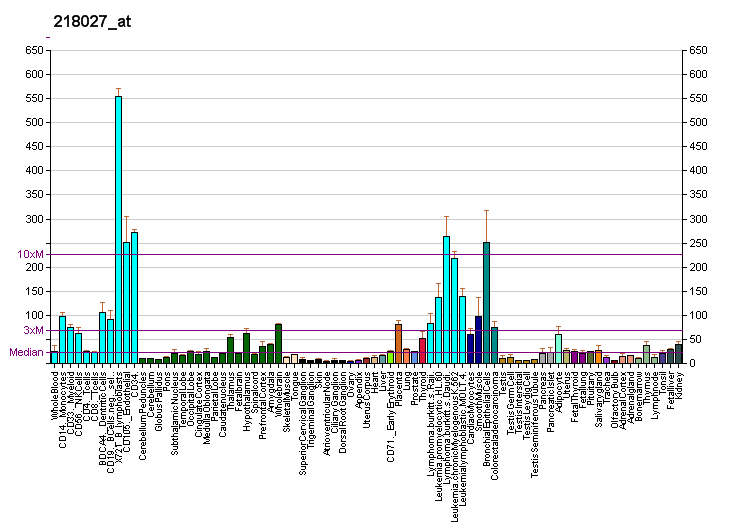
RNA expression pattern
Bgee	Human / Mouse (ortholog); Top expressed in: right ventricle; vastus lateralis muscle; biceps brachii; muscle of thigh; gastrocnemius muscle; Skeletal muscle tissue of biceps brachii; deltoid muscle; triceps brachii muscle; left ventricle; gonad / Top expressed in: morula; sternocleidomastoid muscle; embryo; digastric muscle; muscle of thigh; temporal muscle; epiblast; extraocular muscle; embryo; blastocyst; More reference expression data
BioGPS	More reference expression data
Gene ontology
Molecular function	structural constituent of ribosome; protein binding; RNA binding
Cellular component	mitochondrial inner membrane; large ribosomal subunit; ribosome; mitochondrion; mitochondrial large ribosomal subunit
Biological process	mitochondrial translational elongation; mitochondrial translational termination; protein biosynthesis; cellular response to leukemia inhibitory factor
Sources:Amigo / QuickGO
Orthologs
Databases	NCBI: entry; OMA: entry
Species	Human	Mouse
Entrez	29088	27395
Ensembl	ENSG00000137547	ENSMUSG00000033845
UniProt	Q9P015	Q9CPR5
RefSeq (mRNA)	NM_014175	NM_001177658; NM_025300
RefSeq (protein)	NP_054894	NP_001171129; NP_079576
Location (UCSC)	Chr 8: 54.14 – 54.15 Mb	Chr 1: 4.84 – 4.86 Mb
PubMed search
- Wikidata
View/Edit Human	View/Edit Mouse

39S ribosomal protein L15, mitochondrial is a protein that in humans is encoded by the MRPL15 gene.

Mammalian mitochondrial ribosomal proteins are encoded by nuclear genes and help in protein synthesis within the mitochondrion. Mitochondrial ribosomes (mitoribosomes) consist of a small 28S subunit and a large 39S subunit. They have an estimated 75% protein to rRNA composition compared to prokaryotic ribosomes, where this ratio is reversed. Another difference between mammalian mitoribosomes and prokaryotic ribosomes is that the latter contain a 5S rRNA. Among different species, the proteins comprising the mitoribosome differ greatly in sequence, and sometimes in biochemical properties, which prevents easy recognition by sequence homology. This gene encodes a 39S subunit protein that belongs to the EcoL15 ribosomal protein family. A pseudogene corresponding to this gene is found on chromosome 15q.
