= Mitochondrial ribosomal protein S17 =

Protein-coding gene in the species Homo sapiens

MRPS17

Identifiers
- Aliases: MRPS17, HSPC011, MRP-S17, RPMS17, S17mt, mitochondrial ribosomal protein S17
- External IDs: OMIM: 611980; MGI: 1913508; GeneCards: MRPS17
Available structures
PDB	Ortholog search: PDBe RCSB
PDB	List of PDB id codes 3J9M

Gene location (Human)
Chr.	Chromosome 7 (human)
Band	7p11.2	Start	55,951,877 bp
Band	7p11.2	End	55,956,500 bp

Gene location (Mouse)
Chr.	Chromosome 5 (mouse)
Band	5|5 G1.3	Start	129,715,497 bp
Band	5|5 G1.3	End	129,722,556 bp
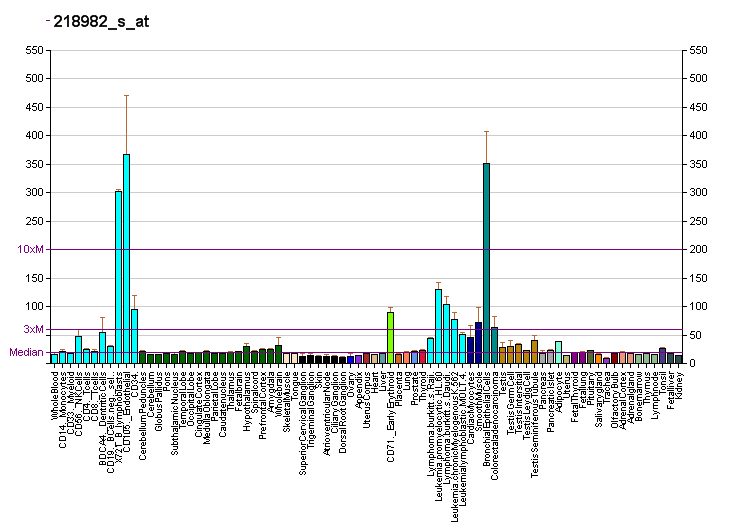
RNA expression pattern
Bgee	Human / Mouse (ortholog); Top expressed in: gastrocnemius muscle; muscle of thigh; skeletal muscle tissue; left ventricle; gonad; mucosa of transverse colon; islet of Langerhans; prefrontal cortex; dorsolateral prefrontal cortex; right lobe of liver / Top expressed in: interventricular septum; right kidney; yolk sac; endocardial cushion; embryo; proximal tubule; neural tube; left lobe of liver; mandibular prominence; embryo; More reference expression data
BioGPS	More reference expression data
Gene ontology
Molecular function	structural constituent of ribosome; rRNA binding; RNA binding
Cellular component	mitochondrial inner membrane; ribosome; intracellular anatomical structure; mitochondrion; mitochondrial small ribosomal subunit
Biological process	mitochondrial translational elongation; mitochondrial translational termination; protein biosynthesis; mitochondrial translation
Sources:Amigo / QuickGO
Orthologs
Databases	NCBI: entry; OMA: entry
Species	Human	Mouse
Entrez	51373	66258
Ensembl	ENSG00000239789	ENSMUSG00000034211
UniProt	Q9Y2R5	Q9CQE3
RefSeq (mRNA)	NM_015969	NM_025450
RefSeq (protein)	NP_057053	NP_079726; NP_001343883; NP_001343884; NP_001343885; NP_001343886 NP_001343887; NP_001343888
Location (UCSC)	Chr 7: 55.95 – 55.96 Mb	Chr 5: 129.72 – 129.72 Mb
PubMed search
- Wikidata
View/Edit Human	View/Edit Mouse

28S ribosomal protein S17, mitochondrial is a protein that in humans is encoded by the MRPS17 gene.

Mammalian mitochondrial ribosomal proteins are encoded by nuclear genes and help in protein synthesis within the mitochondrion. Mitochondrial ribosomes (mitoribosomes) consist of a small 28S subunit and a large 39S subunit. They have an estimated 75% protein to rRNA composition compared to prokaryotic ribosomes, where this ratio is reversed. Another difference between mammalian mitoribosomes and prokaryotic ribosomes is that the latter contain a 5S rRNA. Among different species, the proteins comprising the mitoribosome differ greatly in sequence, and sometimes in biochemical properties, which prevents easy recognition by sequence homology. This gene encodes a 28S subunit protein that belongs to the ribosomal protein S17P family. The encoded protein is moderately conserved between human mitochondrial and prokaryotic ribosomal proteins. Pseudogenes corresponding to this gene are found on chromosomes 1p, 3p, 6q, 14p, 18q, and Xq.
