= Mitochondrial ribosomal protein S9 =

Protein-coding gene in the species Homo sapiens

MRPS9

Identifiers
- Aliases: MRPS9, MRP-S9, RPMS9, S9mt, mitochondrial ribosomal protein S9
- External IDs: OMIM: 611975; MGI: 1916777; GeneCards: MRPS9
Available structures
PDB	Ortholog search: PDBe RCSB
PDB	List of PDB id codes 3J9M

Gene location (Human)
Chr.	Chromosome 2 (human)
Band	2q12.1	Start	105,038,069 bp
Band	2q12.1	End	105,099,960 bp

Gene location (Mouse)
Chr.	Chromosome 1 (mouse)
Band	1|1 B	Start	42,890,393 bp
Band	1|1 B	End	42,944,843 bp
RNA expression pattern
Bgee	Human / Mouse (ortholog); Top expressed in: myocardium of left ventricle; gastrocnemius muscle; deltoid muscle; tibialis anterior muscle; quadriceps femoris muscle; vastus lateralis muscle; muscle of thigh; apex of heart; mucosa of transverse colon; Skeletal muscle tissue of rectus abdominis / Top expressed in: Paneth cell; medullary collecting duct; atrioventricular junction; fossa; atrioventricular valve; soleus muscle; condyle; endocardial cushion; myocardium of ventricle; epithelium of lens; More reference expression data
BioGPS	n/a
Gene ontology
Molecular function	protein binding; structural constituent of ribosome; RNA binding
Cellular component	mitochondrial inner membrane; ribosome; nucleolus; mitochondrial small ribosomal subunit; mitochondrion
Biological process	maturation of SSU-rRNA from tricistronic rRNA transcript (SSU-rRNA, 5.8S rRNA, LSU-rRNA); mitochondrial translational elongation; mitochondrial translational termination; protein biosynthesis
Sources:Amigo / QuickGO
Orthologs
Databases	NCBI: entry; OMA: entry
Species	Human	Mouse
Entrez	64965	69527
Ensembl	ENSG00000135972	ENSMUSG00000060679
UniProt	P82933	Q9D7N3
RefSeq (mRNA)	NM_182640	NM_023514
RefSeq (protein)	NP_872578	NP_076003
Location (UCSC)	Chr 2: 105.04 – 105.1 Mb	Chr 1: 42.89 – 42.94 Mb
PubMed search
- Wikidata
View/Edit Human	View/Edit Mouse

Mitochondrial ribosomal protein S9 (MRPS9), otherwise known as uS9m, is a protein that in humans is encoded by the MRPS9 gene.

== Function ==
Mammalian mitochondrial ribosomal proteins are encoded by nuclear genes and help in protein synthesis within the mitochondrion. Mitochondrial ribosomes (mitoribosomes) consist of a small 28S subunit and a large 39S subunit. They have an estimated 75% protein to rRNA composition compared to prokaryotic ribosomes, where this ratio is reversed. Another difference between mammalian mitoribosomes and prokaryotic ribosomes is that the latter contain a 5S rRNA. Among different species, the proteins comprising the mitoribosome differ greatly in sequence, and sometimes in biochemical properties, which prevents easy recognition by sequence homology. This gene encodes a 28S subunit protein. [provided by RefSeq, Jul 2008].

== See also ==
- Mitochondrial ribosome
