= Mitochondrial ribosomal protein L18 =

Protein-coding gene in the species Homo sapiens

MRPL18

Identifiers
- Aliases: MRPL18, L18mt, MRP-L18, HSPC071, mitochondrial ribosomal protein L18
- External IDs: OMIM: 611831; MGI: 1914931; GeneCards: MRPL18
Available structures
PDB	Ortholog search: PDBe RCSB
PDB	List of PDB id codes 3J7Y

Gene location (Human)
Chr.	Chromosome 6 (human)
Band	6q25.3	Start	159,789,812 bp
Band	6q25.3	End	159,798,436 bp

Gene location (Mouse)
Chr.	Chromosome 17 (mouse)
Band	17|17 A1	Start	13,130,236 bp
Band	17|17 A1	End	13,135,232 bp
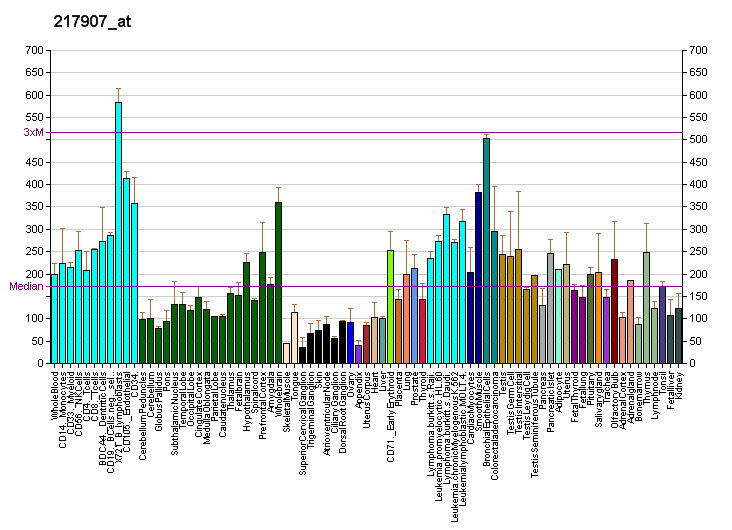
RNA expression pattern
Bgee	Human / Mouse (ortholog); Top expressed in: oocyte; secondary oocyte; olfactory bulb; palpebral conjunctiva; muscle of thigh; anterior cingulate cortex; mucosa of transverse colon; smooth muscle tissue; prefrontal cortex; C1 segment / Top expressed in: blastocyst; primary oocyte; secondary oocyte; embryo; heart; proximal tubule; quadriceps femoris muscle; epiblast; embryo; morula; More reference expression data
BioGPS	More reference expression data
Gene ontology
Molecular function	structural constituent of ribosome; 5S rRNA binding; RNA binding
Cellular component	mitochondrial inner membrane; ribosome; mitochondrial ribosome; intracellular anatomical structure; extracellular space; mitochondrial large ribosomal subunit; mitochondrion
Biological process	mitochondrial translational elongation; mitochondrial translational termination; rRNA import into mitochondrion; protein biosynthesis; transport
Sources:Amigo / QuickGO
Orthologs
Databases	NCBI: entry; OMA: entry
Species	Human	Mouse
Entrez	29074	67681
Ensembl	ENSG00000112110	ENSMUSG00000057388
UniProt	Q9H0U6	Q9CQL5
RefSeq (mRNA)	NM_014161; NM_001318817	NM_026310
RefSeq (protein)	NP_001305746; NP_054880	NP_080586
Location (UCSC)	Chr 6: 159.79 – 159.8 Mb	Chr 17: 13.13 – 13.14 Mb
PubMed search
- Wikidata
View/Edit Human	View/Edit Mouse

39S ribosomal protein L18, mitochondrial is a protein that in humans is encoded by the MRPL18 gene.

Mammalian mitochondrial ribosomal proteins are encoded by nuclear genes and help in protein synthesis within the mitochondrion. Mitochondrial ribosomes (mitoribosomes) consist of a small 28S subunit and a large 39S subunit. They have an estimated 75% protein to rRNA composition compared to prokaryotic ribosomes, where this ratio is reversed. Another difference between mammalian mitoribosomes and prokaryotic ribosomes is that the latter contain a 5S rRNA. Among different species, the proteins comprising the mitoribosome differ greatly in sequence, and sometimes in biochemical properties, which prevents easy recognition by sequence homology. This gene encodes a 39S subunit protein that belongs to the L18P ribosomal protein family. Three polymorphic sites exist in this gene, one of which is three nt in length which causes an extra aa near the N-terminus.
