= Mitochondrial ribosomal protein S11 =

Protein-coding gene in the species Homo sapiens

MRPS11

Identifiers
- Aliases: MRPS11, HCC-2, MRP-S11, S11mt, mitochondrial ribosomal protein S11
- External IDs: OMIM: 611977; MGI: 1915244; GeneCards: MRPS11
Available structures
PDB	Ortholog search: PDBe RCSB
PDB	List of PDB id codes 3J9M

Gene location (Human)
Chr.	Chromosome 15 (human)
Band	15q25.3	Start	88,467,453 bp
Band	15q25.3	End	88,480,776 bp

Gene location (Mouse)
Chr.	Chromosome 7 (mouse)
Band	7|7 D2	Start	78,432,867 bp
Band	7|7 D2	End	78,442,737 bp
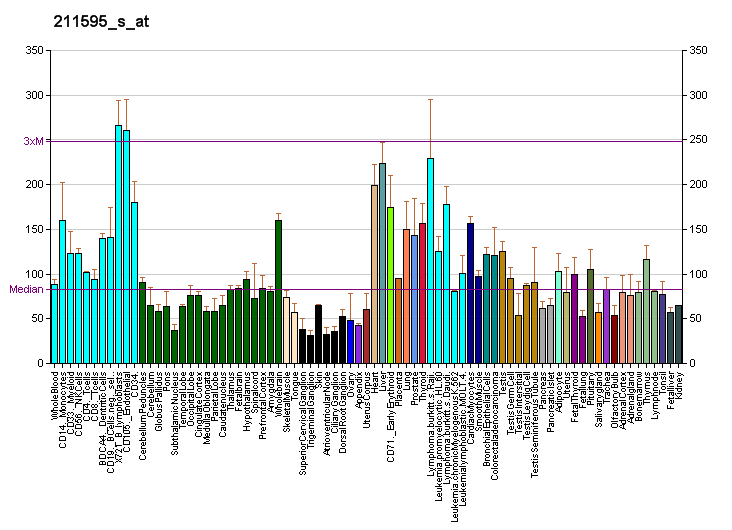
RNA expression pattern
Bgee	Human / Mouse (ortholog); Top expressed in: apex of heart; mucosa of transverse colon; left ventricle; left adrenal gland; right adrenal gland; right adrenal cortex; left adrenal cortex; right lobe of thyroid gland; right auricle of heart; muscle of thigh / Top expressed in: spermatid; blastocyst; embryo; spermatocyte; embryo; right kidney; morula; adrenal gland; sternocleidomastoid muscle; yolk sac; More reference expression data
BioGPS	More reference expression data
Gene ontology
Molecular function	structural constituent of ribosome; mRNA 5'-UTR binding; small ribosomal subunit rRNA binding; RNA binding
Cellular component	mitochondrial inner membrane; ribosome; mitochondrion; mitochondrial small ribosomal subunit
Biological process	ribosomal small subunit assembly; maturation of SSU-rRNA from tricistronic rRNA transcript (SSU-rRNA, 5.8S rRNA, LSU-rRNA); mitochondrial translational elongation; mitochondrial translational termination; protein biosynthesis; mitochondrial translation
Sources:Amigo / QuickGO
Orthologs
Databases	NCBI: entry; OMA: entry
Species	Human	Mouse
Entrez	64963	67994
Ensembl	ENSG00000181991	ENSMUSG00000030611
UniProt	P82912	Q9DCA2
RefSeq (mRNA)	NM_022839; NM_176805; NM_001321970; NM_001321972; NM_001321973 NM_001321974; NM_001321976	NM_026498; NM_001360702
RefSeq (protein)	NP_001308899; NP_001308901; NP_001308902; NP_001308903; NP_001308905 NP_073750; NP_789775	n/a
Location (UCSC)	Chr 15: 88.47 – 88.48 Mb	Chr 7: 78.43 – 78.44 Mb
PubMed search
- Wikidata
View/Edit Human	View/Edit Mouse

28S ribosomal protein S11, mitochondrial is a protein that in humans is encoded by the MRPS11 gene.

== Function ==
Mammalian mitochondrial ribosomal proteins are encoded by nuclear genes and help in protein synthesis within the mitochondrion. Mitochondrial ribosomes (mitoribosomes) consist of a small 28S subunit and a large 39S subunit. They have an estimated 75% protein to rRNA composition compared to prokaryotic ribosomes, where this ratio is reversed. Another difference between mammalian mitoribosomes and prokaryotic ribosomes is that the latter contain a 5S rRNA. Among different species, the proteins comprising the mitoribosome differ greatly in sequence, and sometimes in biochemical properties, which prevents easy recognition by sequence homology. This gene encodes a 28S subunit protein that contains a high level of sequence similarity with ribosomal protein S11P family members.
