= Mitochondrial ribosomal protein S26 =

Protein-coding gene in the species Homo sapiens

MRPS26

Identifiers
- Aliases: MRPS26, C20orf193, GI008, MRP-S13, MRP-S26, MRPS13, NY-BR-87, RPMS13, dJ534B8.3, mitochondrial ribosomal protein S26
- External IDs: OMIM: 611988; MGI: 1333830; GeneCards: MRPS26
Available structures
PDB	Ortholog search: PDBe RCSB
PDB	List of PDB id codes 3J9M

Gene location (Human)
Chr.	Chromosome 20 (human)
Band	20p13	Start	3,046,052 bp
Band	20p13	End	3,048,250 bp

Gene location (Mouse)
Chr.	Chromosome 2 (mouse)
Band	2|2 F1	Start	130,405,662 bp
Band	2|2 F1	End	130,410,615 bp
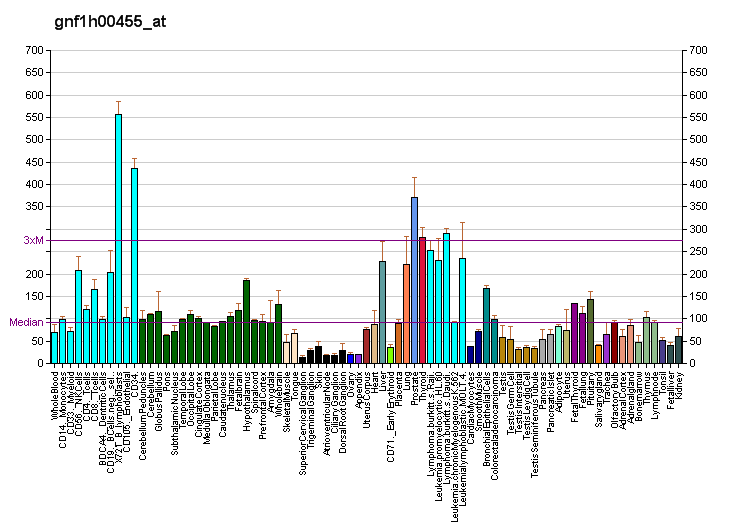
RNA expression pattern
Bgee	Human / Mouse (ortholog); Top expressed in: anterior pituitary; right lobe of liver; myocardium of left ventricle; Brodmann area 9; right adrenal gland; skin of arm; left adrenal gland; left adrenal cortex; mucosa of transverse colon; right adrenal cortex / Top expressed in: supraoptic nucleus; hair follicle; yolk sac; proximal tubule; right kidney; fossa; renal corpuscle; condyle; facial motor nucleus; external carotid artery; More reference expression data
BioGPS	More reference expression data
Gene ontology
Molecular function	RNA binding
Cellular component	mitochondrial inner membrane; ribosome; mitochondrial small ribosomal subunit; nucleoplasm; mitochondrion
Biological process	peptide biosynthetic process; mitochondrial translational elongation; mitochondrial translational termination
Sources:Amigo / QuickGO
Orthologs
Databases	NCBI: entry; OMA: entry
Species	Human	Mouse
Entrez	64949	99045
Ensembl	ENSG00000125901	ENSMUSG00000037740
UniProt	Q9BYN8	Q80ZS3
RefSeq (mRNA)	NM_030811	NM_207207
RefSeq (protein)	NP_110438	NP_997090
Location (UCSC)	Chr 20: 3.05 – 3.05 Mb	Chr 2: 130.41 – 130.41 Mb
PubMed search
- Wikidata
View/Edit Human	View/Edit Mouse

28S ribosomal protein S26, mitochondrial is a protein that in humans is encoded by the MRPS26 gene.

Mammalian mitochondrial ribosomal proteins are encoded by nuclear genes and help in protein synthesis within the mitochondrion. Mitochondrial ribosomes (mitoribosomes) consist of a small 28S subunit and a large 39S subunit. They have an estimated 75% protein to rRNA composition compared to prokaryotic ribosomes, where this ratio is reversed. Another difference between mammalian mitoribosomes and prokaryotic ribosomes is that the latter contain a 5S rRNA. Among different species, the proteins comprising the mitoribosome differ greatly in sequence, and sometimes in biochemical properties, which prevents easy recognition by sequence homology. This gene encodes a 28S subunit protein. This gene lies adjacent to and downstream of the gonadotropin-releasing hormone precursor gene.
