= Mitochondrial ribosomal protein S28 =

Protein-coding gene in the species Homo sapiens

MRPS28

Identifiers
- Aliases: MRPS28, MRP-S28, MRP-S35, MRPS35, HSPC007, mitochondrial ribosomal protein S28, COXPD47
- External IDs: OMIM: 611990; MGI: 1913480; GeneCards: MRPS28
Available structures
PDB	Ortholog search: PDBe RCSB
PDB	List of PDB id codes 3J9M

Gene location (Human)
Chr.	Chromosome 8 (human)
Band	8q21.13	Start	79,918,717 bp
Band	8q21.13	End	80,030,289 bp

Gene location (Mouse)
Chr.	Chromosome 3 (mouse)
Band	3|3 A1	Start	8,867,206 bp
Band	3|3 A1	End	8,988,978 bp
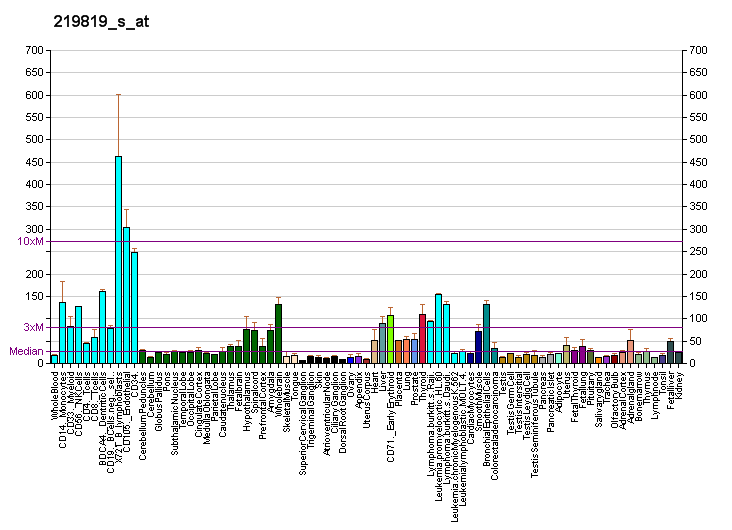
RNA expression pattern
Bgee	Human / Mouse (ortholog); Top expressed in: right adrenal gland; right adrenal cortex; left adrenal gland; muscle of thigh; left adrenal cortex; gastrocnemius muscle; islet of Langerhans; left ventricle; substantia nigra; skeletal muscle tissue / Top expressed in: triceps brachii muscle; sternocleidomastoid muscle; temporal muscle; digastric muscle; soleus muscle; skeletal muscle tissue; extraocular muscle; quadriceps femoris muscle; tibialis anterior muscle; thoracic diaphragm; More reference expression data
BioGPS	More reference expression data
Gene ontology
Molecular function	RNA binding
Cellular component	mitochondrial inner membrane; ribosome; mitochondrion; mitochondrial small ribosomal subunit
Biological process	mitochondrial translational elongation; mitochondrial translational termination; biological process
Sources:Amigo / QuickGO
Orthologs
Databases	NCBI: entry; OMA: entry
Species	Human	Mouse
Entrez	28957	66230
Ensembl	ENSG00000147586	ENSMUSG00000040269
UniProt	Q9Y2Q9	Q9CY16
RefSeq (mRNA)	NM_014018	NM_025434
RefSeq (protein)	NP_054737	NP_079710
Location (UCSC)	Chr 8: 79.92 – 80.03 Mb	Chr 3: 8.87 – 8.99 Mb
PubMed search
- Wikidata
View/Edit Human	View/Edit Mouse

28S ribosomal protein S28, mitochondrial is a protein that in humans is encoded by the MRPS28 gene.

Mammalian mitochondrial ribosomal proteins are encoded by nuclear genes and help in protein synthesis within the mitochondrion. Mitochondrial ribosomes (mitoribosomes) consist of a small 28S subunit and a large 39S subunit. They have an estimated 75% protein to rRNA composition compared to prokaryotic ribosomes, where this ratio is reversed. Another difference between mammalian mitoribosomes and prokaryotic ribosomes is that the latter contain a 5S rRNA. Among different species, the proteins comprising the mitoribosome differ greatly in sequence, and sometimes in biochemical properties, which prevents easy recognition by sequence homology. This gene encodes a 28S subunit protein that has been called mitochondrial ribosomal protein S35 in the literature.
