= Mitochondrial ribosomal protein S7 =

Protein-coding gene in the species Homo sapiens

MRPS7

Identifiers
- Aliases: MRPS7, MRP-S, MRP-S7, RP-S7, RPMS7, S7mt, bMRP27a, mitochondrial ribosomal protein S7, COXPD34
- External IDs: OMIM: 611974; MGI: 1354367; GeneCards: MRPS7
Available structures
PDB	Ortholog search: PDBe RCSB
PDB	List of PDB id codes 3J9M

Gene location (Human)
Chr.	Chromosome 17 (human)
Band	17q25.1	Start	75,261,674 bp
Band	17q25.1	End	75,266,376 bp

Gene location (Mouse)
Chr.	Chromosome 11 (mouse)
Band	11|11 E2	Start	115,494,751 bp
Band	11|11 E2	End	115,498,862 bp
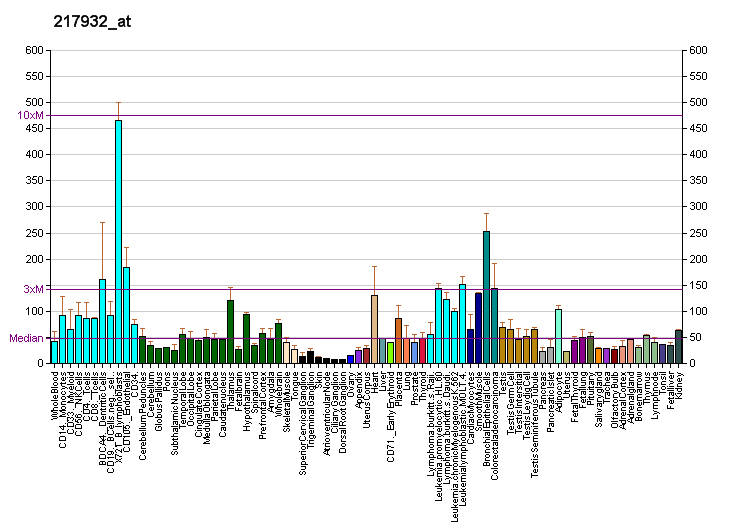
RNA expression pattern
Bgee	Human / Mouse (ortholog); Top expressed in: gastrocnemius muscle; apex of heart; left ventricle; right auricle of heart; mucosa of transverse colon; muscle of thigh; right adrenal gland; right adrenal cortex; left adrenal gland; left adrenal cortex / Top expressed in: right kidney; right ventricle; interventricular septum; proximal tubule; cardiac muscle tissue of left ventricle; plantaris muscle; epiblast; muscle of thigh; left lobe of liver; masseter muscle; More reference expression data
BioGPS	More reference expression data
Gene ontology
Molecular function	RNA binding; mRNA binding; structural constituent of ribosome; rRNA binding
Cellular component	mitochondrial inner membrane; ribosome; mitochondrion; mitochondrial small ribosomal subunit
Biological process	mitochondrial translational elongation; mitochondrial translational termination; mitochondrial translation; ribosomal small subunit assembly; protein biosynthesis
Sources:Amigo / QuickGO
Orthologs
Databases	NCBI: entry; OMA: entry
Species	Human	Mouse
Entrez	51081	50529
Ensembl	ENSG00000125445	ENSMUSG00000046756
UniProt	Q9Y2R9	Q80X85
RefSeq (mRNA)	NM_015971	NM_025305
RefSeq (protein)	NP_057055	NP_079581
Location (UCSC)	Chr 17: 75.26 – 75.27 Mb	Chr 11: 115.49 – 115.5 Mb
PubMed search
- Wikidata
View/Edit Human	View/Edit Mouse

28S ribosomal protein S7, mitochondrial is a protein that is found in humans and is encoded by the MRPS7 gene.

Mammalian mitochondrial ribosomal proteins are encoded by nuclear genes and help in protein synthesis within the mitochondrion. Mitochondrial ribosomes (mitoribosomes) consist of a small 28S subunit and a large 39S subunit. They have an estimated 75% protein to rRNA composition compared to prokaryotic ribosomes, where this ratio is reversed. Another difference between mammalian mitoribosomes and prokaryotic ribosomes is that the latter contain a 5S rRNA. Among different species, the proteins comprising the mitoribosome differ greatly in sequence, and sometimes in biochemical properties, which prevents easy recognition by sequence homology. This gene encodes a 28S subunit protein. In the prokaryotic ribosome, the comparable protein is thought to play an essential role in organizing the 3' domain of the 16S rRNA in the vicinity of the P- and A-sites. Pseudogenes corresponding to this gene are found on chromosomes 8p and 12p.
