= Mitochondrial ribosomal protein L24 =

Protein found in humans

MRPL24
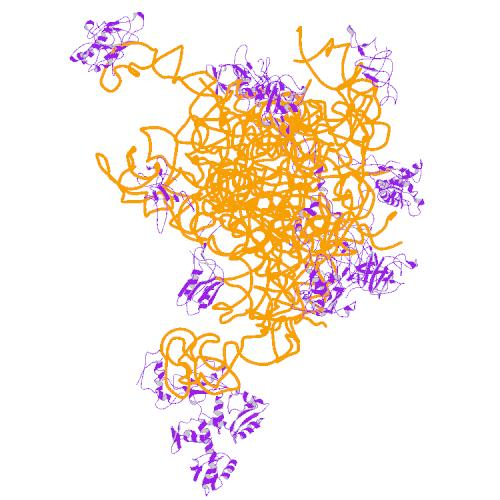

Identifiers
- Aliases: MRPL24, L24mt, MRP-L18, MRP-L24, mitochondrial ribosomal protein L24
- External IDs: OMIM: 611836; MGI: 1914957; GeneCards: MRPL24
Available structures
PDB	Ortholog search: PDBe RCSB
PDB	List of PDB id codes 3J7Y, 3J9M

Gene location (Human)
Chr.	Chromosome 1 (human)
Band	1q23.1	Start	156,737,303 bp
Band	1q23.1	End	156,741,590 bp

Gene location (Mouse)
Chr.	Chromosome 3 (mouse)
Band	3|3 F1	Start	87,826,813 bp
Band	3|3 F1	End	87,830,979 bp
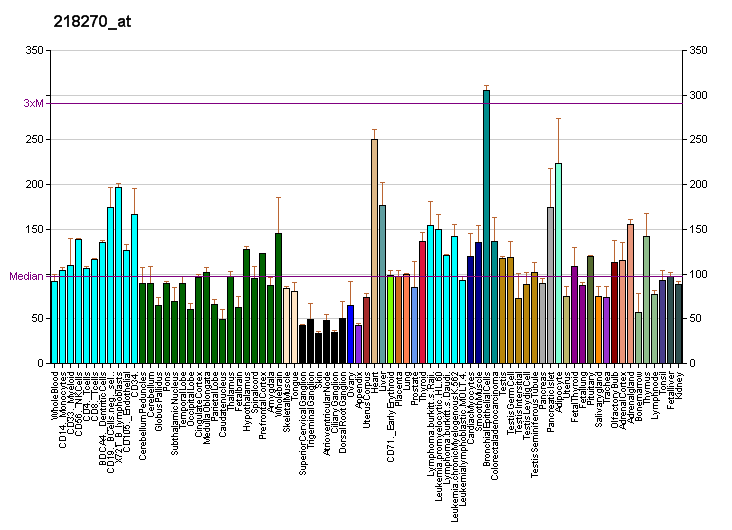
RNA expression pattern
Bgee	Human / Mouse (ortholog); Top expressed in: body of pancreas; apex of heart; muscle of thigh; right adrenal gland; left adrenal cortex; islet of Langerhans; right adrenal cortex; right lobe of liver; gastrocnemius muscle; mucosa of transverse colon / Top expressed in: endocardial cushion; seminal vesicula; spermatocyte; interventricular septum; efferent ductule; cumulus cell; cardiac muscle tissue of left ventricle; Gonadal ridge; medial ganglionic eminence; dermis; More reference expression data
BioGPS	More reference expression data
Gene ontology
Molecular function	structural constituent of ribosome
Cellular component	mitochondrial inner membrane; ribosome; intracellular anatomical structure; mitochondrion; mitochondrial large ribosomal subunit
Biological process	mitochondrial translational elongation; mitochondrial translational termination; protein biosynthesis
Sources:Amigo / QuickGO
Orthologs
Databases	NCBI: entry; OMA: entry
Species	Human	Mouse
Entrez	79590	67707
Ensembl	ENSG00000143314	ENSMUSG00000019710
UniProt	Q96A35	Q9CQ06
RefSeq (mRNA)	NM_024540; NM_145729	NM_026591
RefSeq (protein)	NP_078816; NP_663781	NP_080867
Location (UCSC)	Chr 1: 156.74 – 156.74 Mb	Chr 3: 87.83 – 87.83 Mb
PubMed search
- Wikidata
View/Edit Human	View/Edit Mouse

39S ribosomal protein L24, mitochondrial is a protein that in humans is encoded by the MRPL24 gene.

Mammalian mitochondrial ribosomal proteins are encoded by nuclear genes and help in protein synthesis within the mitochondrion. Mitochondrial ribosomes (mitoribosomes) consist of a small 28S subunit and a large 39S subunit. They have an estimated 75% protein to rRNA composition compared to prokaryotic ribosomes, where this ratio is reversed. Another difference between mammalian mitoribosomes and prokaryotic ribosomes is that the latter contain a 5S rRNA. Among different species, the proteins comprising the mitoribosome differ greatly in sequence, and sometimes in biochemical properties, which prevents easy recognition by sequence homology. This gene encodes a 39S subunit protein which is more than twice the size of its Escherichia coli counterpart (EcoL24). Sequence analysis identified two transcript variants that encode the same protein.
