= Mitochondrial ribosomal protein L33 =

Protein-coding gene in the species Homo sapiens

MRPL33

Identifiers
- Aliases: MRPL33, C2orf1, L33mt, MRP-L33, RPL33L, mitochondrial ribosomal protein L33
- External IDs: OMIM: 610059; MGI: 2137225; GeneCards: MRPL33
Available structures
PDB	Ortholog search: PDBe RCSB
PDB	List of PDB id codes 3J7Y, 3J9M

Gene location (Human)
Chr.	Chromosome 2 (human)
Band	2p23.2	Start	27,771,717 bp
Band	2p23.2	End	27,988,087 bp

Gene location (Mouse)
Chr.	Chromosome 5 (mouse)
Band	5|5 B1	Start	31,754,279 bp
Band	5|5 B1	End	31,821,728 bp
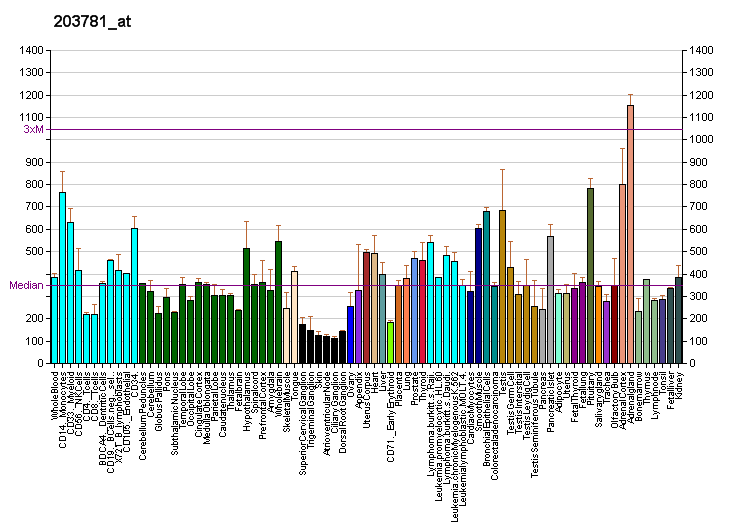
RNA expression pattern
Bgee	Human / Mouse (ortholog); Top expressed in: right adrenal cortex; left adrenal cortex; gastrocnemius muscle; left ventricle; right auricle of heart; apex of heart; biceps brachii; popliteal artery; tibial arteries; thoracic aorta / Top expressed in: granulocyte; yolk sac; morula; muscle of thigh; atrioventricular valve; intercostal muscle; right kidney; ventricular zone; blastocyst; endocardial cushion; More reference expression data
BioGPS	More reference expression data
Gene ontology
Molecular function	structural constituent of ribosome
Cellular component	mitochondrial inner membrane; ribosome; intracellular anatomical structure; mitochondrion; mitochondrial large ribosomal subunit
Biological process	mitochondrial translational elongation; mitochondrial translational termination; protein biosynthesis
Sources:Amigo / QuickGO
Orthologs
Databases	NCBI: entry; OMA: entry
Species	Human	Mouse
Entrez	9553	66845
Ensembl	ENSG00000243147	ENSMUSG00000106918
UniProt	O75394	Q9CQP0
RefSeq (mRNA)	NM_145330; NM_004891	NM_025796
RefSeq (protein)	NP_004882; NP_663303	NP_080072
Location (UCSC)	Chr 2: 27.77 – 27.99 Mb	Chr 5: 31.75 – 31.82 Mb
PubMed search
- Wikidata
View/Edit Human	View/Edit Mouse

39S ribosomal protein L33, mitochondrial is a protein that in humans is encoded by the MRPL33 gene.

== Function ==
Mammalian mitochondrial ribosomal proteins are encoded by nuclear genes and help in protein synthesis within the mitochondrion. Mitochondrial ribosomes (mitoribosomes) consist of a small 28S subunit and a large 39S subunit. They have an estimated 75% protein to rRNA composition compared to prokaryotic ribosomes, where this ratio is reversed. Another difference between mammalian mitoribosomes and prokaryotic ribosomes is that the latter contain a 5S rRNA. Among different species, the proteins comprising the mitoribosome differ greatly in sequence, and sometimes in biochemical properties, which prevents easy recognition by sequence homology. This gene encodes a 39S subunit protein. Alternatively spliced transcript variants encoding different isoforms have been described.
