= Mitochondrial ribosomal protein L40 =

Protein-coding gene in the species Homo sapiens

MRPL40

Identifiers
- Aliases: MRPL40, MRP-L22, MRPL22, NLVCF, URIM, L40mt, MRP-L40, mitochondrial ribosomal protein L40
- External IDs: OMIM: 605089; MGI: 1332635; GeneCards: MRPL40
Available structures
PDB	Ortholog search: PDBe RCSB
PDB	List of PDB id codes 3J7Y, 3J9M

Gene location (Human)
Chr.	Chromosome 22 (human)
Band	22q11.21	Start	19,432,545 bp
Band	22q11.21	End	19,436,075 bp

Gene location (Mouse)
Chr.	Chromosome 16 (mouse)
Band	16 A3|16 11.69 cM	Start	18,690,768 bp
Band	16 A3|16 11.69 cM	End	18,695,612 bp
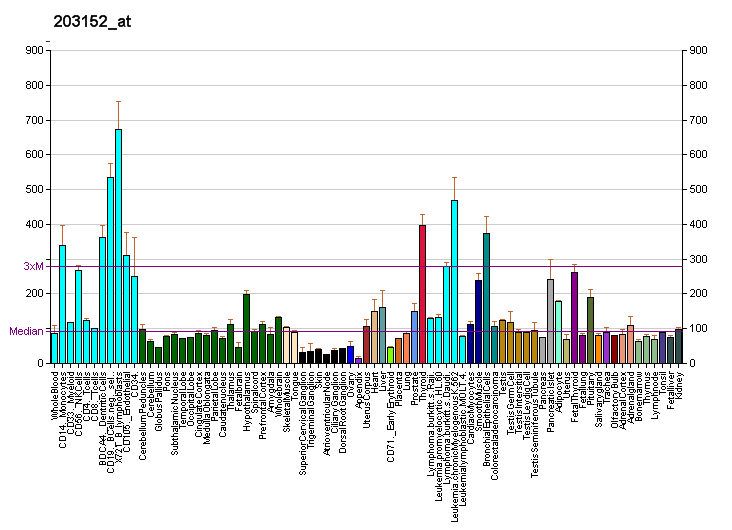
RNA expression pattern
Bgee	Human / Mouse (ortholog); Top expressed in: Skeletal muscle tissue of rectus abdominis; muscle of arm; biceps brachii; right ventricle; Skeletal muscle tissue of biceps brachii; olfactory zone of nasal mucosa; gastrocnemius muscle; triceps brachii muscle; body of tongue; vastus lateralis muscle / Top expressed in: embryo; morula; morula; epiblast; embryo; endothelial cell of lymphatic vessel; epithelium of stomach; primitive streak; yolk sac; otic placode; More reference expression data
BioGPS	More reference expression data
Gene ontology
Molecular function	protein binding; RNA binding
Cellular component	mitochondrial inner membrane; ribosome; nucleus; mitochondrion; mitochondrial large ribosomal subunit; mitochondrial ribosome
Biological process	anatomical structure morphogenesis; mitochondrial translational elongation; mitochondrial translational termination
Sources:Amigo / QuickGO
Orthologs
Databases	NCBI: entry; OMA: entry
Species	Human	Mouse
Entrez	64976	18100
Ensembl	ENSG00000185608	ENSMUSG00000022706
UniProt	Q9NQ50	Q9Z2Q5
RefSeq (mRNA)	NM_003776; NM_001318151; NM_001318152	NM_010922
RefSeq (protein)	NP_001305080; NP_001305081; NP_003767	NP_035052
Location (UCSC)	Chr 22: 19.43 – 19.44 Mb	Chr 16: 18.69 – 18.7 Mb
PubMed search
- Wikidata
View/Edit Human	View/Edit Mouse

39S ribosomal protein L40, mitochondrial is a protein that in humans is encoded by the MRPL40 gene.

Mammalian mitochondrial ribosomal proteins are encoded by nuclear genes and help in protein synthesis within the mitochondrion. Mitochondrial ribosomes (mitoribosomes) consist of a small 28S subunit and a large 39S subunit. They have an estimated 75% protein to rRNA composition compared to prokaryotic ribosomes, where this ratio is reversed. Another difference between mammalian mitoribosomes and prokaryotic ribosomes is that the latter contain a 5S rRNA. Among different species, the proteins comprising the mitoribosome differ greatly in sequence, and sometimes in biochemical properties, which prevents easy recognition by sequence homology. This gene encodes a 39S subunit protein. Deletions in this gene may contribute to the etiology of velo-cardio-facial syndrome and DiGeorge syndrome.
