= Mitochondrial ribosomal protein S21 =

Protein found in humans

MRPS21

Identifiers
- Aliases: MRPS21, MRP-S21, RPMS21, MDS016, mitochondrial ribosomal protein S21, 28S ribosomal protein S21, mitochondrial
- External IDs: OMIM: 611984; MGI: 1913542; GeneCards: MRPS21
Available structures
PDB	Ortholog search: PDBe RCSB
PDB	List of PDB id codes 3J9M

Gene location (Human)
Chr.	Chromosome 1 (human)
Band	1q21.2	Start	150,293,861 bp
Band	1q21.2	End	150,308,979 bp

Gene location (Mouse)
Chr.	Chromosome 3 (mouse)
Band	3|3 F2.1	Start	95,769,946 bp
Band	3|3 F2.1	End	95,778,831 bp
RNA expression pattern
Bgee	Human / Mouse (ortholog); Top expressed in: cardiac muscle tissue of right atrium; myocardium of left ventricle; lateral nuclear group of thalamus; pons; sperm; pancreatic ductal cell; skin of arm; Brodmann area 23; renal medulla; external globus pallidus / Top expressed in: right kidney; interventricular septum; muscle of thigh; plantaris muscle; cardiac muscle tissue of left ventricle; extensor digitorum longus muscle; skeletal muscle tissue; extraocular muscle; yolk sac; dentate gyrus of hippocampal formation granule cell; More reference expression data
BioGPS	n/a
Gene ontology
Molecular function	structural constituent of ribosome; RNA binding
Cellular component	mitochondrial inner membrane; ribosome; mitochondrion; mitochondrial small ribosomal subunit
Biological process	mitochondrial translational elongation; mitochondrial translational termination; mitochondrial translation; protein biosynthesis
Sources:Amigo / QuickGO
Orthologs
Databases	NCBI: entry; OMA: entry
Species	Human	Mouse
Entrez	54460	66292
Ensembl	ENSG00000266472	ENSMUSG00000054312
UniProt	P82921	P58059
RefSeq (mRNA)	NM_031901; NM_018997	NM_078479; NM_001355759
RefSeq (protein)	NP_061870; NP_114107	NP_510964; NP_001342688
Location (UCSC)	Chr 1: 150.29 – 150.31 Mb	Chr 3: 95.77 – 95.78 Mb
PubMed search
- Wikidata
View/Edit Human	View/Edit Mouse

28S ribosomal protein S21, mitochondrial is a protein that in humans is encoded by the MRPS21 gene.

Mammalian mitochondrial ribosomal proteins are encoded by nuclear genes and assist protein synthesis within the mitochondrion. Mitochondrial ribosomes (mitoribosomes) consist of a small 28S subunit and a large 39S subunit. They have an estimated 75% protein to rRNA composition compared to prokaryotic ribosomes, where this ratio is reversed. Another difference between mammalian mitoribosomes and prokaryotic ribosomes is that the latter contain a 5S rRNA. Among different species, the proteins comprising the mitoribosome differ greatly in sequence, and sometimes in biochemical properties, which prevents easy recognition by sequence homology. This gene encodes a 28S subunit protein that belongs to the ribosomal protein S21P family. Pseudogenes corresponding to this gene are found on chromosomes 1p, 1q, 9p, 10p, 10q, 16q, and 17q. Available sequence data analyses identified splice variants that differ in the 5' UTR; both transcripts encode the same protein.
