= Mitochondrial ribosomal protein L23 =

Protein-coding gene in the species Homo sapiens

MRPL23

Identifiers
- Aliases: MRPL23, L23MRP, RPL23, RPL23L, mitochondrial ribosomal protein L23
- External IDs: OMIM: 600789; MGI: 1196612; GeneCards: MRPL23
Available structures
| PDB | Ortholog search: PDBe RCSB |
| PDB | List of PDB id codes 3J7Y, 3J9M |

Gene location (Human)
| Chr. | Chromosome 11 (human) |
| Band | 11p15.5 | Start | 1,947,278 bp |
| Band | 11p15.5 | End | 1,984,522 bp |

Gene location (Mouse)
| Chr. | Chromosome 7 (mouse) |
| Band | 7 F5|7 87.95 cM | Start | 142,086,423 bp |
| Band | 7 F5|7 87.95 cM | End | 142,094,484 bp |
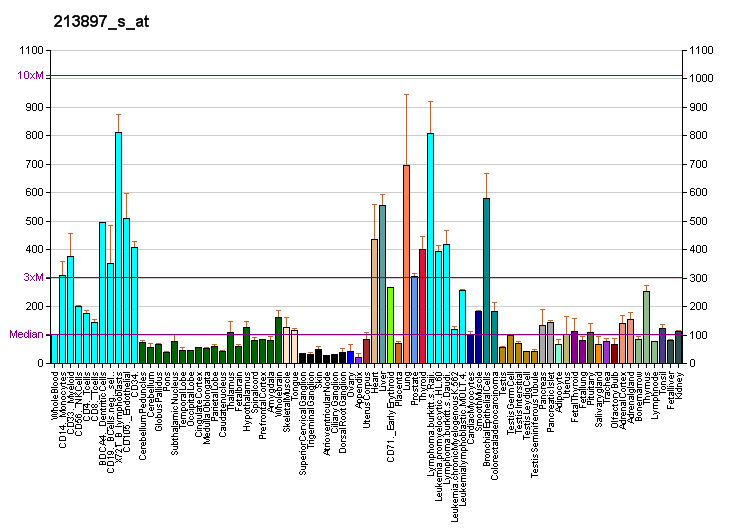
RNA expression pattern
| Bgee | Human / Mouse (ortholog); Top expressed in: olfactory zone of nasal mucosa; apex of heart; right uterine tube; mucosa of transverse colon; anterior pituitary; left adrenal cortex; gastrocnemius muscle; skin of abdomen; minor salivary glands; right lobe of liver / Top expressed in: yolk sac; epiblast; embryo; quadriceps femoris muscle; blastocyst; embryo; neural tube; muscle tissue; morula; stomach; More reference expression data |
| BioGPS | More reference expression data |
Gene ontology
| Molecular function | protein binding; RNA binding; structural constituent of ribosome |
| Cellular component | mitochondrial inner membrane; ribosome; intracellular anatomical structure; mitochondrion; fibrillar center; mitochondrial large ribosomal subunit |
| Biological process | mitochondrial translational elongation; mitochondrial translational termination; protein biosynthesis; mitochondrial translation |
Sources:Amigo / QuickGO
Orthologs
| Databases | NCBI: entry; OMA: entry |
| Species | Human | Mouse |
| Entrez | 6150 | 19935 |
| Ensembl | ENSG00000214026; ENSG00000288141 | ENSMUSG00000037772 |
| UniProt | Q16540 | O35972 |
| RefSeq (mRNA) | NM_021134 | NM_011288 |
| RefSeq (protein) | NP_066957 | NP_035418 |
| Location (UCSC) | Chr 11: 1.95 – 1.98 Mb | Chr 7: 142.09 – 142.09 Mb |
| PubMed search |
- Wikidata
| View/Edit Human | View/Edit Mouse |

39S ribosomal protein L23, mitochondrial is a protein that in humans is encoded by the MRPL23 gene.

== Function ==
Mammalian mitochondrial ribosomal proteins are encoded by nuclear genes and help in protein synthesis within the mitochondrion. Mitochondrial ribosomes (mitoribosomes) consist of a small 28S subunit and a large 39S subunit. They have an estimated 75% protein to rRNA composition compared to prokaryotic ribosomes, where this ratio is reversed. Another difference between mammalian mitoribosomes and prokaryotic ribosomes is that the latter contain a 5S rRNA. Among different species, the proteins comprising the mitoribosome differ greatly in sequence, and sometimes in biochemical properties, which prevents easy recognition by sequence homology. This gene encodes a 39S subunit protein. The gene is biallelically expressed, despite its location within a region of imprinted genes on chromosome 11.
