= Mitochondrial ribosomal protein L10 =

Protein-coding gene in the species Homo sapiens

MRPL10

Identifiers
- Aliases: MRPL10, L10MT, MRP-L10, MRP-L8, MRPL8, RPML8, mitochondrial ribosomal protein L10
- External IDs: OMIM: 611825; MGI: 1333801; GeneCards: MRPL10
Available structures
PDB	Ortholog search: PDBe RCSB
PDB	List of PDB id codes 3J7Y, 3J9M

Gene location (Human)
Chr.	Chromosome 17 (human)
Band	17q21.32	Start	47,823,272 bp
Band	17q21.32	End	47,831,541 bp

Gene location (Mouse)
Chr.	Chromosome 11 (mouse)
Band	11|11 D	Start	96,932,386 bp
Band	11|11 D	End	96,940,039 bp
RNA expression pattern
Bgee	Human / Mouse (ortholog); Top expressed in: apex of heart; left ventricle; muscle of thigh; myocardium of left ventricle; gastrocnemius muscle; cardiac muscle tissue of right atrium; deltoid muscle; tibialis anterior muscle; muscle layer of sigmoid colon; granulocyte / Top expressed in: yolk sac; right ventricle; brown adipose tissue; right kidney; adrenal gland; myocardium of ventricle; proximal tubule; granulocyte; epiblast; left lobe of liver; More reference expression data
BioGPS	n/a
Gene ontology
Molecular function	protein binding; structural constituent of ribosome; RNA binding
Cellular component	ribosome; nucleoplasm; intracellular anatomical structure; mitochondrion; mitochondrial inner membrane; mitochondrial large ribosomal subunit; large ribosomal subunit; ribonucleoprotein complex
Biological process	mitochondrial translational elongation; protein biosynthesis; mitochondrial translational termination; ribosome biogenesis; mitochondrial translation
Sources:Amigo / QuickGO
Orthologs
Databases	NCBI: entry; OMA: entry
Species	Human	Mouse
Entrez	124995	107732
Ensembl	ENSG00000159111	ENSMUSG00000001445
UniProt	Q7Z7H8	Q3TBW2
RefSeq (mRNA)	NM_145255; NM_148887	NM_026154; NM_001357807; NM_001357808
RefSeq (protein)	NP_660298; NP_683685	NP_080430; NP_001344736; NP_001344737
Location (UCSC)	Chr 17: 47.82 – 47.83 Mb	Chr 11: 96.93 – 96.94 Mb
PubMed search
- Wikidata
View/Edit Human	View/Edit Mouse

39S ribosomal protein L10, mitochondrial is a protein that in humans is encoded by the MRPL10 gene.

Mammalian mitochondrial ribosomal proteins are encoded by nuclear genes and help in protein synthesis within the mitochondrion. Mitochondrial ribosomes (mitoribosomes) consist of a small 28S subunit and a large 39S subunit. They have an estimated 75% protein to rRNA composition compared to prokaryotic ribosomes, where this ratio is reversed. Another difference between mammalian mitoribosomes and prokaryotic ribosomes is that the latter contain a 5S rRNA. Among different species, the proteins comprising the mitoribosome differ greatly in sequence, and sometimes in biochemical properties, which prevents easy recognition by sequence homology. This gene encodes a 39S subunit protein. Sequence analysis identified two transcript variants that encode different isoforms. A pseudogene corresponding to this gene is found on chromosome 5q.
