= Mitochondrial ribosomal protein L1 =

Protein-coding gene in the species Homo sapiens

MRPL1
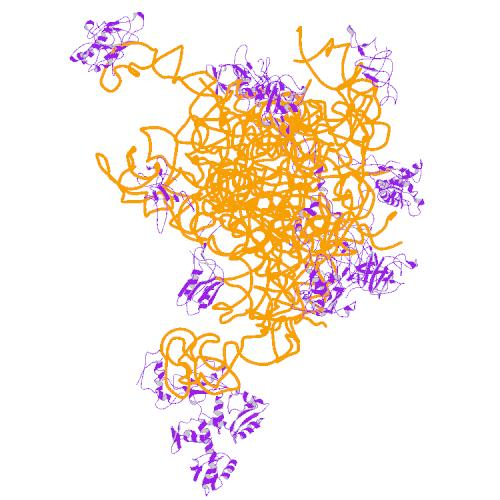

Identifiers
- Aliases: MRPL1, BM022, L1MT, MRP-L1, mitochondrial ribosomal protein L1
- External IDs: OMIM: 611821; MGI: 2137202; GeneCards: MRPL1

Gene location (Human)
Chr.	Chromosome 4 (human)
Band	4q21.1	Start	77,862,830 bp
Band	4q21.1	End	77,952,785 bp

Gene location (Mouse)
Chr.	Chromosome 5 (mouse)
Band	5|5 E3	Start	96,357,352 bp
Band	5|5 E3	End	96,414,586 bp
RNA expression pattern
Bgee	Human / Mouse (ortholog); Top expressed in: myocardium of left ventricle; Skeletal muscle tissue of rectus abdominis; Skeletal muscle tissue of biceps brachii; deltoid muscle; quadriceps femoris muscle; vastus lateralis muscle; tibialis anterior muscle; gonad; muscle of thigh; mucosa of transverse colon / Top expressed in: interventricular septum; intercostal muscle; myocardium of ventricle; seminiferous tubule; epithelium of small intestine; soleus muscle; left lobe of liver; cumulus cell; quadriceps femoris muscle; epiblast; More reference expression data
BioGPS	n/a
Gene ontology
Molecular function	structural constituent of ribosome; protein binding; RNA binding; box H/ACA snoRNA binding
Cellular component	mitochondrial inner membrane; large ribosomal subunit; ribosome; cytosolic large ribosomal subunit; mitochondrion; box H/ACA snoRNP complex
Biological process	mitochondrial translational elongation; mitochondrial translational termination; maturation of LSU-rRNA; protein biosynthesis; cleavage involved in rRNA processing; rRNA pseudouridine synthesis; snRNA pseudouridine synthesis
Sources:Amigo / QuickGO
Orthologs
Databases	NCBI: entry; OMA: entry
Species	Human	Mouse
Entrez	65008	94061
Ensembl	ENSG00000169288	ENSMUSG00000029486
UniProt	Q9BYD6	Q99N96
RefSeq (mRNA)	NM_020236	NM_001039084; NM_053158
RefSeq (protein)	NP_064621	NP_001034173; NP_444388
Location (UCSC)	Chr 4: 77.86 – 77.95 Mb	Chr 5: 96.36 – 96.41 Mb
PubMed search
- Wikidata
View/Edit Human	View/Edit Mouse

39S ribosomal protein L1, mitochondrial is a protein that in humans is encoded by the MRPL1 gene.

Mammalian mitochondrial ribosomal proteins are encoded by nuclear genes and help in protein synthesis within the mitochondrion. Mitochondrial ribosomes (mitoribosomes) consist of a small 28S subunit and a large 39S subunit. They have an estimated 75% protein to rRNA composition compared to prokaryotic ribosomes, where this ratio is reversed. Another difference between mammalian mitoribosomes and prokaryotic ribosomes is that the latter contain a 5S rRNA. Among different species, the proteins comprising the mitoribosome differ greatly in sequence, and sometimes in biochemical properties, which prevents easy recognition by sequence homology. This gene encodes a 39S subunit protein that belongs to the L1 ribosomal protein family.
