= Mitochondrial ribosomal protein L37 =

Protein found in humans

MRPL37

Identifiers
- Aliases: MRPL37, L37mt, MRP-L2, MRP-L37, MRPL2, RPML2, mitochondrial ribosomal protein L37, L2mt
- External IDs: OMIM: 611843; MGI: 1926268; GeneCards: MRPL37
Available structures
PDB	Ortholog search: PDBe RCSB
PDB	List of PDB id codes 3J7Y, 3J9M

Gene location (Human)
Chr.	Chromosome 1 (human)
Band	1p32.3	Start	54,184,041 bp
Band	1p32.3	End	54,225,464 bp

Gene location (Mouse)
Chr.	Chromosome 4 (mouse)
Band	4|4 C7	Start	106,913,071 bp
Band	4|4 C7	End	106,924,065 bp
RNA expression pattern
Bgee	Human / Mouse (ortholog); Top expressed in: gastrocnemius muscle; muscle of thigh; right adrenal gland; skin of arm; right adrenal cortex; tibialis anterior muscle; left ventricle; right lobe of liver; left adrenal gland; apex of heart / Top expressed in: genital tubercle; tail of embryo; muscle of thigh; right kidney; ventricular zone; embryo; lip; skeletal muscle tissue; embryo; triceps brachii muscle; More reference expression data
BioGPS	n/a
Gene ontology
Molecular function	structural constituent of ribosome; RNA binding
Cellular component	mitochondrial inner membrane; ribosome; mitochondrial ribosome; mitochondrial large ribosomal subunit; mitochondrion
Biological process	mitochondrial translational elongation; mitochondrial translational termination; protein biosynthesis
Sources:Amigo / QuickGO
Orthologs
Databases	NCBI: entry; OMA: entry
Species	Human	Mouse
Entrez	51253	56280
Ensembl	ENSG00000116221	ENSMUSG00000028622
UniProt	Q9BZE1	Q921S7
RefSeq (mRNA)	NM_016491; NM_001330602	NM_025500
RefSeq (protein)	NP_001317531; NP_057575	NP_079776
Location (UCSC)	Chr 1: 54.18 – 54.23 Mb	Chr 4: 106.91 – 106.92 Mb
PubMed search
- Wikidata
View/Edit Human	View/Edit Mouse

39S ribosomal protein L37, mitochondrial is a protein that in humans is encoded by the MRPL37 gene.

Mammalian mitochondrial ribosomal proteins are encoded by nuclear genes and help in protein synthesis within the mitochondrion. Mitochondrial ribosomes (mitoribosomes) consist of a small 28S subunit and a large 39S subunit. They have an estimated 75% protein to rRNA composition compared to prokaryotic ribosomes, where this ratio is reversed. Another difference between mammalian mitoribosomes and prokaryotic ribosomes is that the latter contain a 5S rRNA. Among different species, the proteins comprising the mitoribosome differ greatly in sequence, and sometimes in biochemical properties, which prevents easy recognition by sequence homology. This gene encodes a 39S subunit protein.
