= Mitochondrial ribosomal protein S30 =

Protein-coding gene in the species Homo sapiens

MRPS30

Identifiers
- Aliases: MRPS30, MRP-S30, PAP, PDCD9, S30mt, mitochondrial ribosomal protein S30
- External IDs: OMIM: 611991; MGI: 1926237; GeneCards: MRPS30
Available structures
PDB	Ortholog search: PDBe RCSB
PDB	List of PDB id codes 3J7Y, 3J9M

Gene location (Human)
Chr.	Chromosome 5 (human)
Band	5p12	Start	44,808,947 bp
Band	5p12	End	44,820,428 bp

Gene location (Mouse)
Chr.	Chromosome 13 (mouse)
Band	13|13 D2.3	Start	118,514,917 bp
Band	13|13 D2.3	End	118,523,788 bp
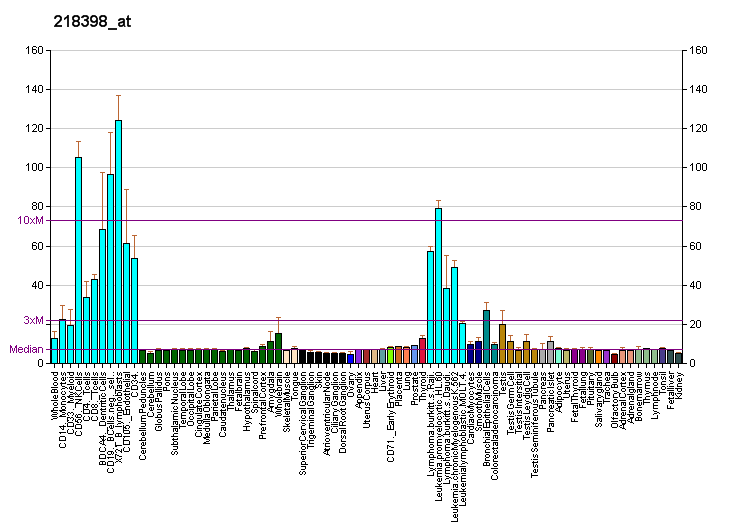

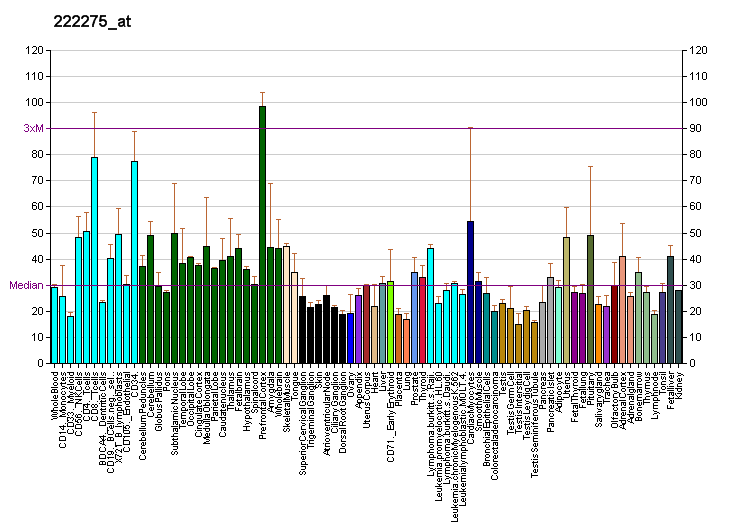
RNA expression pattern
Bgee	Human / Mouse (ortholog); Top expressed in: endothelial cell; gonad; Brodmann area 23; middle temporal gyrus; muscle of thigh; gastrocnemius muscle; ganglionic eminence; rectum; ventricular zone; biceps brachii / Top expressed in: interventricular septum; endocardial cushion; cumulus cell; soleus muscle; atrioventricular valve; somite; brown adipose tissue; mandibular prominence; migratory enteric neural crest cell; abdominal wall; More reference expression data
BioGPS	More reference expression data
Gene ontology
Molecular function	structural constituent of ribosome; RNA binding
Cellular component	mitochondrial inner membrane; ribosome; mitochondrion; mitochondrial large ribosomal subunit
Biological process	mitochondrial translational elongation; mitochondrial translational termination; protein biosynthesis; apoptotic process
Sources:Amigo / QuickGO
Orthologs
Databases	NCBI: entry; OMA: entry
Species	Human	Mouse
Entrez	10884	59054
Ensembl	ENSG00000112996	ENSMUSG00000021731
UniProt	Q9NP92	Q9D0G0
RefSeq (mRNA)	NM_016640	NM_021556
RefSeq (protein)	NP_057724	NP_067531
Location (UCSC)	Chr 5: 44.81 – 44.82 Mb	Chr 13: 118.51 – 118.52 Mb
PubMed search
- Wikidata
View/Edit Human	View/Edit Mouse

28S ribosomal protein S30, mitochondrial is a protein that in humans is encoded by the MRPS30 gene.

Mammalian mitochondrial ribosomal proteins are encoded by nuclear genes and help in protein synthesis within the mitochondrion. Mitochondrial ribosomes (mitoribosomes) consist of a small 28S subunit and a large 39S subunit. They have an estimated 75% protein to rRNA composition compared to prokaryotic ribosomes, where this ratio is reversed. Another difference between mammalian mitoribosomes and prokaryotic ribosomes is that the latter contain a 5S rRNA. Among different species, the proteins comprising the mitoribosome differ greatly in sequence, and sometimes in biochemical properties, which prevents easy recognition by sequence homology. This gene encodes a 28S subunit protein that is similar to the chicken pro-apoptotic protein p52. Transcript variants using alternative promoters or polyA sites have been mentioned in the literature but the complete description of these sequences is not available.
