= Mitochondrial ribosomal protein S6 =

Protein-coding gene in the species Homo sapiens

MRPS6

Identifiers
- Aliases: MRPS6, C21orf101, MRP-S6, RPMS6, S6mt, mitochondrial ribosomal protein S6
- External IDs: OMIM: 611973; MGI: 2153111; GeneCards: MRPS6
Available structures
PDB	Ortholog search: PDBe RCSB
PDB	List of PDB id codes 3J9M

Gene location (Human)
Chr.	Chromosome 21 (human)
Band	21q22.11	Start	34,073,224 bp
Band	21q22.11	End	34,143,034 bp

Gene location (Mouse)
Chr.	Chromosome 16 (mouse)
Band	16|16 C4	Start	91,855,158 bp
Band	16|16 C4	End	91,909,115 bp
RNA expression pattern
Bgee	Human / Mouse (ortholog); Top expressed in: renal medulla; left lobe of thyroid gland; decidua; gonad; human kidney; right lobe of thyroid gland; tibial arteries; right adrenal cortex; right coronary artery; tibial nerve / Top expressed in: vestibular membrane of cochlear duct; Epithelium of choroid plexus; vestibular sensory epithelium; retinal pigment epithelium; epithelium of lens; endothelial cell of lymphatic vessel; ciliary body; right kidney; medullary collecting duct; sciatic nerve; More reference expression data
BioGPS	n/a
Gene ontology
Molecular function	structural constituent of ribosome; rRNA binding; protein binding; small ribosomal subunit rRNA binding
Cellular component	small ribosomal subunit; mitochondrial inner membrane; ribosome; mitochondrial small ribosomal subunit; mitochondrion
Biological process	mitochondrial translational elongation; mitochondrial translational termination; protein biosynthesis; mitochondrial translation
Sources:Amigo / QuickGO
Orthologs
Databases	NCBI: entry; OMA: entry
Species	Human	Mouse
Entrez	64968	121022
Ensembl	ENSG00000243927	ENSMUSG00000039680
UniProt	P82932	P58064
RefSeq (mRNA)	NM_032476	NM_080456
RefSeq (protein)	NP_115865	NP_536704
Location (UCSC)	Chr 21: 34.07 – 34.14 Mb	Chr 16: 91.86 – 91.91 Mb
PubMed search
- Wikidata
View/Edit Human	View/Edit Mouse

28S ribosomal protein S6, mitochondrial is a protein that in humans is encoded by the MRPS6 gene.

Mammalian mitochondrial ribosomal proteins are encoded by nuclear genes and help in protein synthesis within the mitochondrion. Mitochondrial ribosomes (mitoribosomes) consist of a small 28S subunit and a large 39S subunit. They have an estimated 75% protein to rRNA composition compared to prokaryotic ribosomes, where this ratio is reversed. Another difference between mammalian mitoribosomes and prokaryotic ribosomes is that the latter contain a 5S rRNA. Among different species, the proteins comprising the mitoribosome differ greatly in sequence, and sometimes in biochemical properties, which prevents easy recognition by sequence homology. This gene encodes a 28S subunit protein that belongs to the ribosomal protein S6P family. Pseudogenes corresponding to this gene are found on chromosomes 1p and 12q.
