= Mitochondrial ribosomal protein L3 =

Protein-coding gene in the species Homo sapiens

MRPL3

Identifiers
- Aliases: MRPL3, COXPD9, MRL3, RPML3, mitochondrial ribosomal protein L3
- External IDs: OMIM: 607118; MGI: 2137204; GeneCards: MRPL3
Available structures
PDB	Ortholog search: PDBe RCSB
PDB	List of PDB id codes 3J7Y, 3J9M

Gene location (Human)
Chr.	Chromosome 3 (human)
Band	3q22.1	Start	131,462,212 bp
Band	3q22.1	End	131,502,983 bp

Gene location (Mouse)
Chr.	Chromosome 9 (mouse)
Band	9|9 F1	Start	104,930,438 bp
Band	9|9 F1	End	104,957,087 bp
RNA expression pattern
Bgee	Human / Mouse (ortholog); Top expressed in: secondary oocyte; tibia; gingival epithelium; mucosa of sigmoid colon; corpus epididymis; caput epididymis; sperm; right ventricle; germinal epithelium; kidney tubule / Top expressed in: endocardial cushion; atrioventricular valve; hair follicle; Paneth cell; endothelial cell of lymphatic vessel; ureter; medullary collecting duct; primitive streak; soleus muscle; renal corpuscle; More reference expression data
BioGPS	n/a
Gene ontology
Molecular function	structural constituent of ribosome; RNA binding
Cellular component	mitochondrial inner membrane; ribosome; intracellular anatomical structure; mitochondrion; mitochondrial large ribosomal subunit
Biological process	mitochondrial translational elongation; mitochondrial translational termination; protein biosynthesis
Sources:Amigo / QuickGO
Orthologs
Databases	NCBI: entry; OMA: entry
Species	Human	Mouse
Entrez	11222	94062
Ensembl	ENSG00000114686	ENSMUSG00000032563
UniProt	P09001	Q99N95
RefSeq (mRNA)	NM_007208	NM_053159; NM_001364512; NM_001364513
RefSeq (protein)	NP_009139	NP_444389; NP_001351441; NP_001351442
Location (UCSC)	Chr 3: 131.46 – 131.5 Mb	Chr 9: 104.93 – 104.96 Mb
PubMed search
- Wikidata
View/Edit Human	View/Edit Mouse

Mitochondrial ribosomal protein L3 is a protein that in humans is encoded by the MRPL3 gene. The MRPL3 gene encodes a protein of the 39S large subunit of the mitoribosome, which belongs to the L3P ribosomal protein family. Additionally, a pseudogene corresponding to this gene is located on chromosome 13q. [provided by RefSeq, Jul 2008].

== Mitoribosome ==
Mammalian mitochondrial ribosomal proteins are encoded by nuclear genes and play a crucial role in protein synthesis within the mitochondrion. Mitoribosomes consist of a small 28S subunit and a large 39S subunit. Unlike prokaryotic ribosomes, mitoribosomes are composed of approximately 75% protein and 25% rRNA, whereas this ratio is reversed in prokaryotic ribosomes. Another key difference is the absence of 5S rRNA in mammalian mitoribosomes, which is present in their prokaryotic counterparts. The proteins that comprise the mitoribosome differ greatly in sequence and, in some cases, in biochemical properties across different species. This variability complicates identification by sequence homology.

== Clinical relevance ==
Mutations in this gene have been shown to cause mitochondrial cardiomyopathy.
