= Mitochondrial ribosomal protein S16 =

Protein-coding gene in the species Homo sapiens

MRPS16

Identifiers
- Aliases: MRPS16, COXPD2, MRP-S16, RPMS16, CGI-132, mitochondrial ribosomal protein S16
- External IDs: OMIM: 609204; MGI: 1913492; GeneCards: MRPS16
Available structures
PDB	Ortholog search: PDBe RCSB
PDB	List of PDB id codes 3J9M

Gene location (Human)
Chr.	Chromosome 10 (human)
Band	10q22.2	Start	73,248,843 bp
Band	10q22.2	End	73,252,693 bp

Gene location (Mouse)
Chr.	Chromosome 14 (mouse)
Band	14|14 A3	Start	20,439,372 bp
Band	14|14 A3	End	20,443,702 bp
RNA expression pattern
Bgee	Human / Mouse (ortholog); Top expressed in: mucosa of transverse colon; right adrenal gland; gastrocnemius muscle; right adrenal cortex; left adrenal gland; left adrenal cortex; muscle of thigh; left ventricle; rectum; right auricle of heart / Top expressed in: digastric muscle; temporal muscle; sternocleidomastoid muscle; extraocular muscle; cardiac muscles; myocardium of ventricle; triceps brachii muscle; calvaria; brown adipose tissue; intercostal muscle; More reference expression data
BioGPS	n/a
Gene ontology
Molecular function	structural constituent of ribosome; protein binding
Cellular component	mitochondrial inner membrane; ribosome; intracellular anatomical structure; mitochondrion; mitochondrial small ribosomal subunit; cytosol
Biological process	mitochondrial translational elongation; mitochondrial translational termination; protein biosynthesis; mitochondrial translation
Sources:Amigo / QuickGO
Orthologs
Databases	NCBI: entry; OMA: entry
Species	Human	Mouse
Entrez	51021	66242
Ensembl	ENSG00000182180	ENSMUSG00000049960
UniProt	Q9Y3D3	Q9CPX7
RefSeq (mRNA)	NM_016065	NM_025440
RefSeq (protein)	NP_057149	NP_079716
Location (UCSC)	Chr 10: 73.25 – 73.25 Mb	Chr 14: 20.44 – 20.44 Mb
PubMed search
- Wikidata
View/Edit Human	View/Edit Mouse

28S ribosomal protein S16, mitochondrial is a protein that in humans is encoded by the MRPS16 gene.

Mammalian mitochondrial ribosomal proteins are encoded by nuclear genes and help in protein synthesis within the mitochondrion. Mitochondrial ribosomes (mitoribosomes) consist of a small 28S subunit and a large 39S subunit. They have an estimated 75% protein to rRNA composition compared to prokaryotic ribosomes, where this ratio is reversed. Another difference between mammalian mitoribosomes and prokaryotic ribosomes is that the latter contain a 5S rRNA. Among different species, the proteins comprising the mitoribosome differ greatly in sequence, and sometimes in biochemical properties, which prevents easy recognition by sequence homology. This gene encodes a 28S subunit protein that belongs to the ribosomal protein S16P family. The encoded protein is one of the most highly conserved ribosomal proteins between mammalian and yeast mitochondria. Three pseudogenes (located at 8q21.3, 20q13.32, 22q12-q13.1) for this gene have been described.
