= Mitochondrial ribosomal protein L4 =

Protein-coding gene in the species Homo sapiens

MRPL4
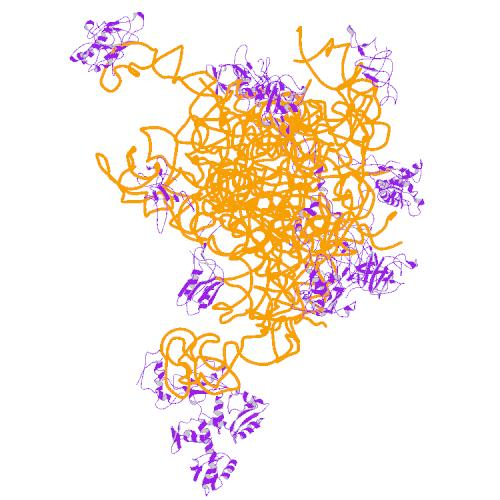

Identifiers
- Aliases: MRPL4, CGI-28, L4mt, mitochondrial ribosomal protein L4
- External IDs: OMIM: 611823; MGI: 2137210; GeneCards: MRPL4
Available structures
PDB	Ortholog search: PDBe RCSB
PDB	List of PDB id codes 3J7Y, 3J9M,%%s3J7Y, 3J9M

Gene location (Human)
Chr.	Chromosome 19 (human)
Band	19p13.2	Start	10,251,901 bp
Band	19p13.2	End	10,260,055 bp

Gene location (Mouse)
Chr.	Chromosome 9 (mouse)
Band	9|9 A3	Start	20,914,034 bp
Band	9|9 A3	End	20,920,135 bp
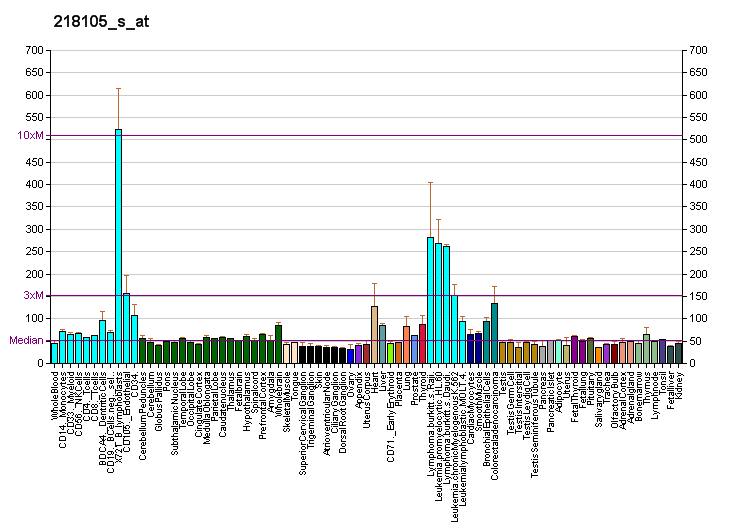
RNA expression pattern
Bgee	Human / Mouse (ortholog); Top expressed in: apex of heart; mucosa of transverse colon; right auricle of heart; right adrenal gland; left adrenal gland; right adrenal cortex; right lobe of liver; left ventricle; left adrenal cortex; skin of abdomen / Top expressed in: interventricular septum; right kidney; myocardium of ventricle; right ventricle; extensor digitorum longus muscle; cardiac muscle tissue of left ventricle; brown adipose tissue; internal carotid artery; adrenal gland; external carotid artery; More reference expression data
BioGPS	More reference expression data
Gene ontology
Molecular function	structural constituent of ribosome; protein binding; RNA binding
Cellular component	mitochondrial inner membrane; ribosome; mitochondrion; cytosolic ribosome; mitochondrial large ribosomal subunit
Biological process	mitochondrial translational elongation; mitochondrial translational termination; protein biosynthesis
Sources:Amigo / QuickGO
Orthologs
Databases	NCBI: entry; OMA: entry
Species	Human	Mouse
Entrez	51073	66163
Ensembl	ENSG00000105364	ENSMUSG00000003299
UniProt	Q9BYD3	Q9DCU6
RefSeq (mRNA)	NM_015956; NM_146387; NM_146388	NM_023167; NM_001357899
RefSeq (protein)	NP_057040; NP_666499; NP_666500; NP_057040.2; NP_666499.1	NP_075656; NP_001344828
Location (UCSC)	Chr 19: 10.25 – 10.26 Mb	Chr 9: 20.91 – 20.92 Mb
PubMed search
- Wikidata
View/Edit Human	View/Edit Mouse

39S ribosomal protein L4, mitochondrial is a protein that in humans is encoded by the MRPL4 gene.

Mammalian mitochondrial ribosomal proteins are encoded by nuclear genes and help in protein synthesis within the mitochondrion. Mitochondrial ribosomes (mitoribosomes) consist of a small 28S subunit and a large 39S subunit. They have an estimated 75% protein to rRNA composition compared to prokaryotic ribosomes, where this ratio is reversed. Another difference between mammalian mitoribosomes and prokaryotic ribosomes is that the latter contain a 5S rRNA. Among different species, the proteins comprising the mitoribosome differ greatly in sequence, and sometimes in biochemical properties, which prevents easy recognition by sequence homology. This gene encodes a 39S subunit protein. Sequence analysis identified alternatively spliced variants that encode different protein isoforms.
