= Mitochondrial ribosomal protein L30 =

Protein-coding gene in the species Homo sapiens

MRPL30

Identifiers
- Aliases: MRPL30, L28MT, L30MT, MRP-L28, MRP-L30, MRPL28, MRPL28M, RPML28, mitochondrial ribosomal protein L30
- External IDs: OMIM: 611838; MGI: 1333820; GeneCards: MRPL30
Available structures
PDB	Ortholog search: PDBe RCSB
PDB	List of PDB id codes 3J7Y, 3J9M

Gene location (Human)
Chr.	Chromosome 2 (human)
Band	2q11.2	Start	99,181,152 bp
Band	2q11.2	End	99,199,561 bp

Gene location (Mouse)
Chr.	Chromosome 1 (mouse)
Band	1|1 B	Start	37,929,558 bp
Band	1|1 B	End	37,937,616 bp
RNA expression pattern
Bgee	Human / Mouse (ortholog); Top expressed in: tibialis anterior muscle; myocardium of left ventricle; pancreatic ductal cell; mucosa of ileum; deltoid muscle; cardiac muscle tissue of right atrium; vastus lateralis muscle; gingival epithelium; biceps brachii; Achilles tendon / Top expressed in: digastric muscle; intercostal muscle; sternocleidomastoid muscle; brown adipose tissue; medial ganglionic eminence; triceps brachii muscle; temporal muscle; genital tubercle; right ventricle; tail of embryo; More reference expression data
BioGPS	n/a
Gene ontology
Molecular function	structural constituent of ribosome
Cellular component	mitochondrial inner membrane; ribosome; large ribosomal subunit; mitochondrial large ribosomal subunit; mitochondrion
Biological process	mitochondrial translational elongation; mitochondrial translational termination; protein biosynthesis
Sources:Amigo / QuickGO
Orthologs
Databases	NCBI: entry; OMA: entry
Species	Human	Mouse
Entrez	51263	107734
Ensembl	ENSG00000185414	ENSMUSG00000026087
UniProt	Q8TCC3	Q9D7N6
RefSeq (mRNA)	NM_016503; NM_145212; NM_145213	NM_027098; NM_001356482
RefSeq (protein)	NP_660213	NP_081374; NP_001343411
Location (UCSC)	Chr 2: 99.18 – 99.2 Mb	Chr 1: 37.93 – 37.94 Mb
PubMed search
- Wikidata
View/Edit Human	View/Edit Mouse

39S ribosomal protein L30, mitochondrial is a protein that in humans is encoded by the MRPL30 gene.

== Function ==
Mammalian mitochondrial ribosomal proteins are encoded by nuclear genes and help in protein synthesis within the mitochondrion. Mitochondrial ribosomes (mitoribosomes) consist of a small 28S subunit and a large 39S subunit. They have an estimated 75% protein to rRNA composition compared to prokaryotic ribosomes, where this ratio is reversed. Another difference between mammalian mitoribosomes and prokaryotic ribosomes is that the latter contain a 5S rRNA. Among different species, the proteins comprising the mitoribosome differ greatly in sequence, and sometimes in biochemical properties, which prevents easy recognition by sequence homology. This gene encodes a 39S subunit protein. Sequence analysis identified at least two transcript variants encoding the same protein. Pseudogenes corresponding to this gene are found on chromosomes 6p and 12p.
