= Mitochondrial ribosomal protein S5 =

Protein-coding gene in the species Homo sapiens

MRPS5

Identifiers
- Aliases: MRPS5, MRP-S5, S5mt, mitochondrial ribosomal protein S5, 28S ribosomal protein S5, mitochondrial
- External IDs: OMIM: 611972; MGI: 1924971; GeneCards: MRPS5
Available structures
| PDB | Ortholog search: PDBe RCSB |
| PDB | List of PDB id codes 3J9M |

Gene location (Human)
| Chr. | Chromosome 2 (human) |
| Band | 2q11.1 | Start | 95,085,369 bp |
| Band | 2q11.1 | End | 95,122,027 bp |

Gene location (Mouse)
| Chr. | Chromosome 2 (mouse) |
| Band | 2|2 F1 | Start | 127,429,142 bp |
| Band | 2|2 F1 | End | 127,448,749 bp |
RNA expression pattern
| Bgee | Human / Mouse (ortholog); Top expressed in: cerebellar hemisphere; pancreatic epithelial cell; tibialis anterior muscle; right lobe of liver; gastrocnemius muscle; renal medulla; deltoid muscle; Brodmann area 9; hypothalamus; right adrenal gland / Top expressed in: ventricular zone; embryo; muscle of thigh; spermatocyte; embryo; blastocyst; right kidney; neural layer of retina; dentate gyrus of hippocampal formation granule cell; epiblast; More reference expression data |
| BioGPS | n/a |
Gene ontology
| Molecular function | structural constituent of ribosome; RNA binding |
| Cellular component | mitochondrial inner membrane; ribosome; mitochondrion; cytosolic small ribosomal subunit; mitochondrial small ribosomal subunit |
| Biological process | mitochondrial translational elongation; mitochondrial translational termination; protein biosynthesis |
Sources:Amigo / QuickGO
Orthologs
| Databases | NCBI: entry; OMA: entry |
| Species | Human | Mouse |
| Entrez | 64969 | 77721 |
| Ensembl | ENSG00000289685 | ENSMUSG00000027374 |
| UniProt | P82675 | Q99N87 |
| RefSeq (mRNA) | NM_031902; NM_001321995; NM_001321996; NM_001321997 | NM_029963 |
| RefSeq (protein) | NP_001308924; NP_001308925; NP_001308926; NP_114108 | NP_084239 |
| Location (UCSC) | Chr 2: 95.09 – 95.12 Mb | Chr 2: 127.43 – 127.45 Mb |
| PubMed search |
- Wikidata
| View/Edit Human | View/Edit Mouse |

28S ribosomal protein S5, mitochondrial, otherwise called uS5m, is a protein that in humans is encoded by the MRPS5 gene.

== Function ==
Mammalian mitochondrial ribosomal proteins are encoded by nuclear genes and help in protein synthesis within the mitochondrion. Mitochondrial ribosomes (mitoribosomes) consist of a small 28S subunit and a large 39S subunit. They have an estimated 75% protein to rRNA composition compared to prokaryotic ribosomes, where this ratio is reversed. Another difference between mammalian mitoribosomes and prokaryotic ribosomes is that the latter contain a 5S rRNA. Among different species, the proteins comprising the mitoribosome differ greatly in sequence, and sometimes in biochemical properties, which prevents easy recognition by sequence homology. This gene encodes a 28S subunit protein that belongs to the ribosomal protein S5P family. Pseudogenes corresponding to this gene are found on chromosomes 4q, 5q, and 18q.
