= Mitochondrial ribosomal protein L42 =

Protein-coding gene in the species Homo sapiens

MRPL42

Identifiers
- Aliases: MRPL42, L31MT, L42MT, MRP-L31, MRP-L42, MRP-S32, MRPL31, MRPS32, PTD007, RPML31, S32MT, HSPC204, Mitochondrial ribosomal protein L42
- External IDs: OMIM: 611847; MGI: 1333774; GeneCards: MRPL42
Available structures
PDB	Ortholog search: PDBe RCSB
PDB	List of PDB id codes 3J7Y, 3J9M

Gene location (Human)
Chr.	Chromosome 12 (human)
Band	12q22	Start	93,467,514 bp
Band	12q22	End	93,516,214 bp

Gene location (Mouse)
Chr.	Chromosome 10 (mouse)
Band	10 C2|10 49.39 cM	Start	95,316,667 bp
Band	10 C2|10 49.39 cM	End	95,337,802 bp
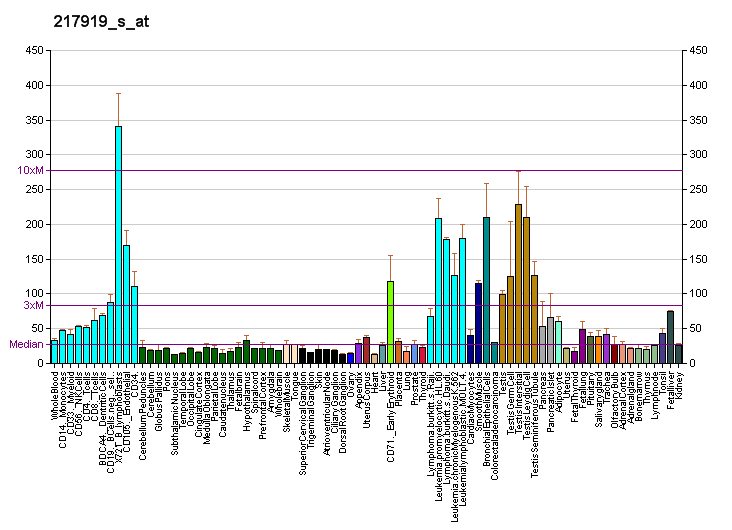
RNA expression pattern
Bgee	Human / Mouse (ortholog); Top expressed in: islet of Langerhans; ganglionic eminence; rectum; sperm; endothelial cell; ventricular zone; right testis; left testis; gonad; right adrenal cortex / Top expressed in: quadriceps femoris muscle; skeletal muscle tissue; heart; muscle of thigh; right kidney; proximal tubule; yolk sac; embryo; epiblast; stomach; More reference expression data
BioGPS	More reference expression data
Gene ontology
Molecular function	structural constituent of ribosome; RNA binding
Cellular component	mitochondrial inner membrane; plasma membrane; ribosome; mitochondrion; mitochondrial small ribosomal subunit; mitochondrial large ribosomal subunit
Biological process	mitochondrial translational elongation; mitochondrial translational termination; protein biosynthesis
Sources:Amigo / QuickGO
Orthologs
Databases	NCBI: entry; OMA: entry
Species	Human	Mouse
Entrez	28977	67270
Ensembl	ENSG00000198015	ENSMUSG00000062981
UniProt	Q9Y6G3	Q9CPV3
RefSeq (mRNA)	NM_014050; NM_172177; NM_172178	NM_026065; NM_001359476; NM_001359477
RefSeq (protein)	NP_054769; NP_751917	NP_080341; NP_001346405; NP_001346406
Location (UCSC)	Chr 12: 93.47 – 93.52 Mb	Chr 10: 95.32 – 95.34 Mb
PubMed search
- Wikidata
View/Edit Human	View/Edit Mouse

28S ribosomal protein L42, mitochondrial is a protein that in humans is encoded by the MRPL42 gene.

Mammalian mitochondrial ribosomal proteins are encoded by nuclear genes and help in protein synthesis within the mitochondrion. Mitochondrial ribosomes (mitoribosomes) consist of a small 28S subunit and a large 39S subunit. They have an estimated 75% protein to rRNA composition compared to prokaryotic ribosomes, where this ratio is reversed. Another difference between mammalian mitoribosomes and prokaryotic ribosomes is that the latter contain a 5S rRNA. Among different species, the proteins comprising the mitoribosome differ greatly in sequence, and sometimes in biochemical properties, which prevents easy recognition by sequence homology. This gene encodes a protein identified as belonging to both the 28S and the 39S subunits. Further experiments will be needed to identify the specific subunit localization. Sequence analysis identified three transcript variants that encode two different isoforms. Pseudogenes corresponding to this gene are found on chromosomes 4q, 6p, 6q, 7p, and 15q.
