= Mitochondrial ribosomal protein L19 =

Protein-coding gene in the species Homo sapiens

MRPL19
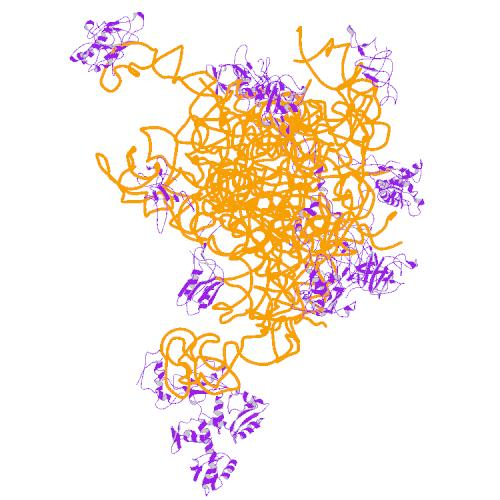

Identifiers
- Aliases: MRPL19, L19mt, MRP-L15, MRP-L19, MRPL15, RLX1, RPML15, mitochondrial ribosomal protein L19
- External IDs: OMIM: 611832; MGI: 1926274; GeneCards: MRPL19
Available structures
PDB	Ortholog search: PDBe RCSB
PDB	List of PDB id codes 3J7Y, 3J9M

Gene location (Human)
Chr.	Chromosome 2 (human)
Band	2p12	Start	75,646,783 bp
Band	2p12	End	75,690,851 bp

Gene location (Mouse)
Chr.	Chromosome 6 (mouse)
Band	6 C3|6 35.81 cM	Start	81,934,832 bp
Band	6 C3|6 35.81 cM	End	81,942,939 bp
RNA expression pattern
Bgee	Human / Mouse (ortholog); Top expressed in: gastrocnemius muscle; right adrenal gland; Skeletal muscle tissue of biceps brachii; left adrenal gland; rectum; right adrenal cortex; gingival epithelium; left adrenal cortex; islet of Langerhans; muscle of thigh / Top expressed in: endocardial cushion; medullary collecting duct; epiblast; otic placode; migratory enteric neural crest cell; blastocyst; atrioventricular valve; atrium; renal corpuscle; lateral septal nucleus; More reference expression data
BioGPS	n/a
Gene ontology
Molecular function	structural constituent of ribosome
Cellular component	mitochondrial inner membrane; ribosome; nuclear membrane; intracellular anatomical structure; nucleus; mitochondrion; mitochondrial large ribosomal subunit
Biological process	mitochondrial translational elongation; mitochondrial translational termination; protein biosynthesis
Sources:Amigo / QuickGO
Orthologs
Databases	NCBI: entry; OMA: entry
Species	Human	Mouse
Entrez	9801	56284
Ensembl	ENSG00000115364	ENSMUSG00000030045
UniProt	P49406	Q9D338
RefSeq (mRNA)	NM_014763	NM_026490
RefSeq (protein)	NP_055578	NP_080766
Location (UCSC)	Chr 2: 75.65 – 75.69 Mb	Chr 6: 81.93 – 81.94 Mb
PubMed search
- Wikidata
View/Edit Human	View/Edit Mouse

39S ribosomal protein L19, mitochondrial is a protein that in humans is encoded by the MRPL19 gene.

Mammalian mitochondrial ribosomal proteins are encoded by nuclear genes and help in protein synthesis within the mitochondrion. Mitochondrial ribosomes (mitoribosomes) consist of a small 28S subunit and a large 39S subunit. They have an estimated 75% protein to rRNA composition compared to prokaryotic ribosomes, where this ratio is reversed. Another difference between mammalian mitoribosomes and prokaryotic ribosomes is that the latter contain a 5S rRNA. Among different species, the proteins comprising the mitoribosome differ greatly in sequence, and sometimes in biochemical properties, which prevents easy recognition by sequence homology. This gene encodes a 39S subunit protein.
