= Nelremagpran =

Identifiers
- IUPAC name: 3-[[2-chloro-4-(trifluoromethyl)phenoxy]methyl]-2-fluorobenzoic acid
- CAS Number: 2492595-24-9
- PubChem CID: 155145968
- ChemSpider: 115008493
- UNII: BL83FAK6DZ
- ChEMBL: ChEMBL4855031

Chemical and physical data
- Formula: C_{15}H_{9}ClF_{4}O_{3}
- Molar mass: 348.68 g·mol^{−1}
- 3D model (JSmol): Interactive image
- SMILES: C1=CC(=C(C(=C1)C(=O)O)F)COC2=C(C=C(C=C2)C(F)(F)F)Cl
- InChI: InChI=1S/C15H9ClF4O3/c16-11-6-9(15(18,19)20)4-5-12(11)23-7-8-2-1-3-10(13(8)17)14(21)22/h1-6H,7H2,(H,21,22); Key:TWOXPNAILYKJPT-UHFFFAOYSA-N

Nelremagpran is an experimental drug that acts as a potent and selective antagonist (or possibly inverse agonist) of the MAS-related Gq protein-coupled receptor X4 (MRGPRX4). It has antiinflammatory effects in animal studies. This receptor is poorly characterised but is thought to be involved in immune system function, and development of selective ligands is essential for researching its role in the body.
