= PSB-22040 =

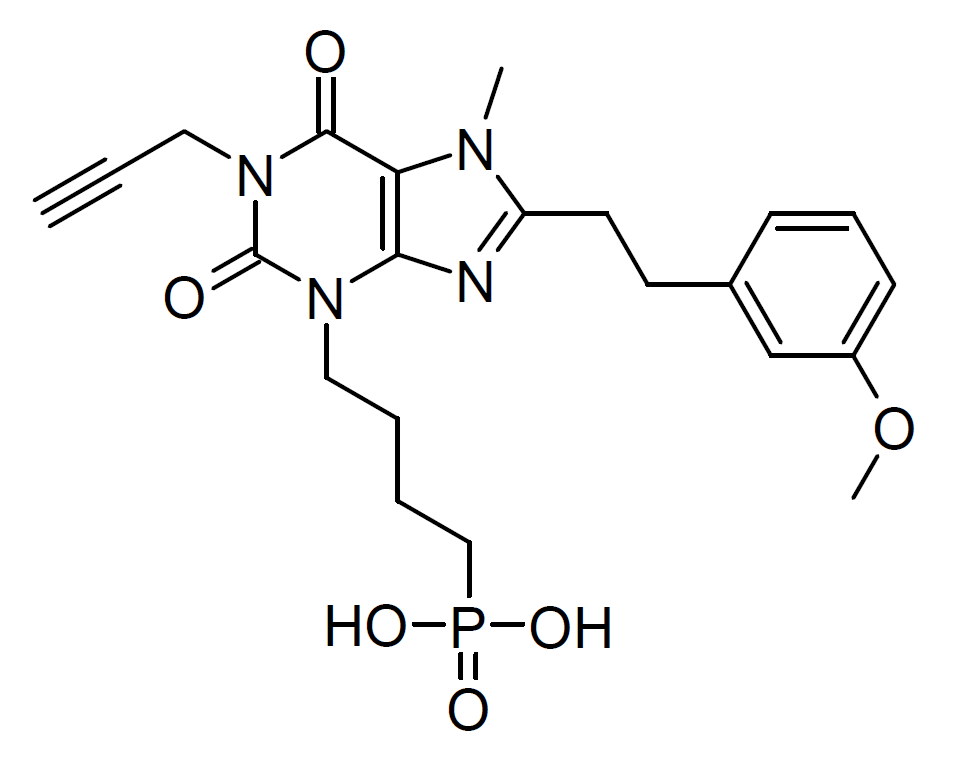

Identifiers
- IUPAC name: 4-[8-[2-(3-methoxyphenyl)ethyl]-7-methyl-2,6-dioxo-1-prop-2-ynylpurin-3-yl]butylphosphonic acid
- CAS Number: 2768131-35-5
- PubChem CID: 163254818
- ChEMBL: ChEMBL5408226

Chemical and physical data
- Formula: C_{22}H_{27}N_{4}O_{6}P
- Molar mass: 474.454 g·mol^{−1}
- 3D model (JSmol): Interactive image
- SMILES: CN1C(=NC2=C1C(=O)N(C(=O)N2CCCCP(=O)(O)O)CC#C)CCC3=CC(=CC=C3)OC
- InChI: InChI=1S/C22H27N4O6P/c1-4-12-26-21(27)19-20(25(22(26)28)13-5-6-14-33(29,30)31)23-18(24(19)2)11-10-16-8-7-9-17(15-16)32-3/h1,7-9,15H,5-6,10-14H2,2-3H3,(H2,29,30,31); Key:AZZJGHGFQWAMCB-UHFFFAOYSA-N

PSB-22040 is an experimental drug that acts as a potent and selective agonist of the MAS-related Gq protein-coupled receptor X4 (MRGPRX4). This receptor is poorly characterised but is thought to be involved in immune system function, and development of selective ligands is essential for researching its role in the body.
