= MRGPRX4 =

Protein-coding gene in the species Homo sapiens

Identifiers
- Aliases: MRGPRX4, GPCR, MRGX4, SNSR6, MAS related GPR family member X4
- External IDs: OMIM: 607230; MGI: 3033139; GeneCards: MRGPRX4

Gene location (Human)
Chr.	Chromosome 11 (human)
Band	11p15.1	Start	18,172,837 bp
Band	11p15.1	End	18,174,280 bp

Gene location (Mouse)
Chr.	Chromosome 7 (mouse)
Band	7|7 B4	Start	47,670,719 bp
Band	7|7 B4	End	47,677,345 bp
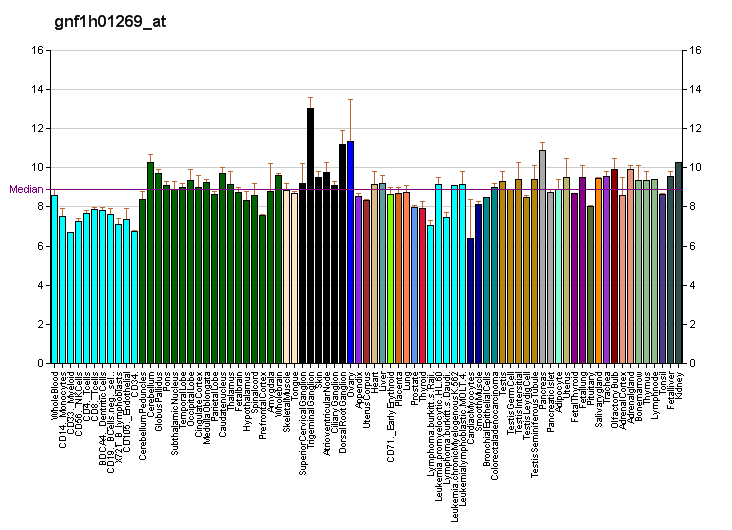
RNA expression pattern
Bgee	Human / Mouse (ortholog); Top expressed in: skin of thigh; skin of hip; olfactory zone of nasal mucosa / Top expressed in: lip; neural tube; More reference expression data
BioGPS	More reference expression data
Gene ontology
Molecular function	signal transducer activity; G protein-coupled receptor activity
Cellular component	integral component of membrane; plasma membrane; membrane; integral component of plasma membrane
Biological process	G protein-coupled receptor signaling pathway; signal transduction
Sources:Amigo / QuickGO
Orthologs
Databases	NCBI: entry; OMA: entry
Species	Human	Mouse
Entrez	117196	404242
Ensembl	ENSG00000179817	ENSMUSG00000070552
UniProt	Q96LA9	Q8CIP3
RefSeq (mRNA)	NM_054032	NM_207540
RefSeq (protein)	NP_473373	NP_997423
Location (UCSC)	Chr 11: 18.17 – 18.17 Mb	Chr 7: 47.67 – 47.68 Mb
PubMed search
- Wikidata
View/Edit Human	View/Edit Mouse

Mas-related G-protein coupled receptor member X4 is a protein that in humans is encoded by the MRGPRX4 gene.

== Ligands ==
Agonists

- PSB-22040

Antagonists and inverse agonists

- Nelremagpran

== See also ==
- MAS1 oncogene
