= OR2D3 =

Protein-coding gene in the species Homo sapiens

Identifiers
- Aliases: OR2D3, OR11-89, olfactory receptor family 2 subfamily D member 3
- External IDs: MGI: 3030550; GeneCards: OR2D3

Gene location (Human)
Chr.	Chromosome 11 (human)
Band	11p15.4	Start	6,921,002 bp
Band	11p15.4	End	6,921,994 bp

Gene location (Mouse)
Chr.	Chromosome 7 (mouse)
Band	7|7 E3	Start	106,737,534 bp
Band	7|7 E3	End	106,749,788 bp
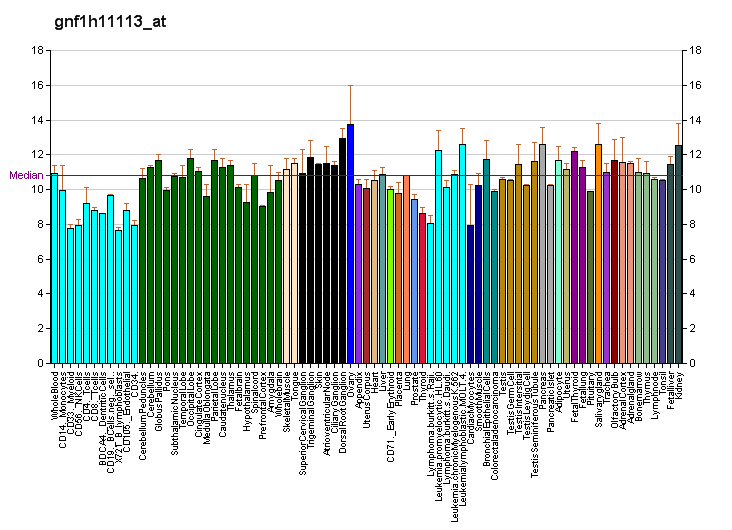

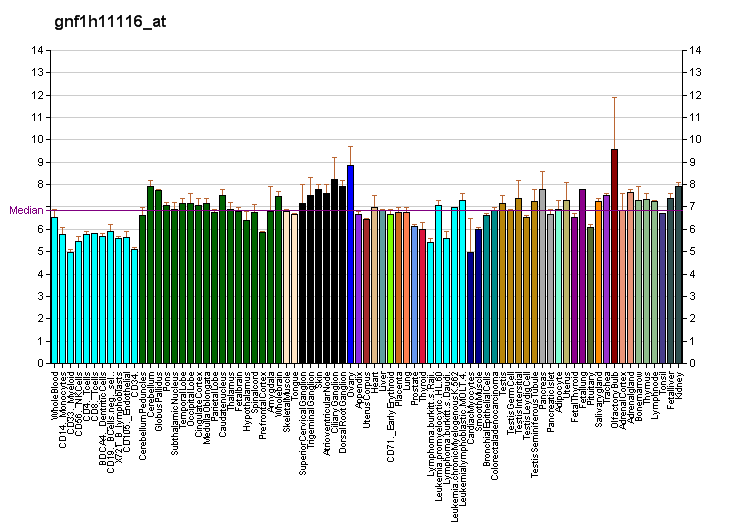

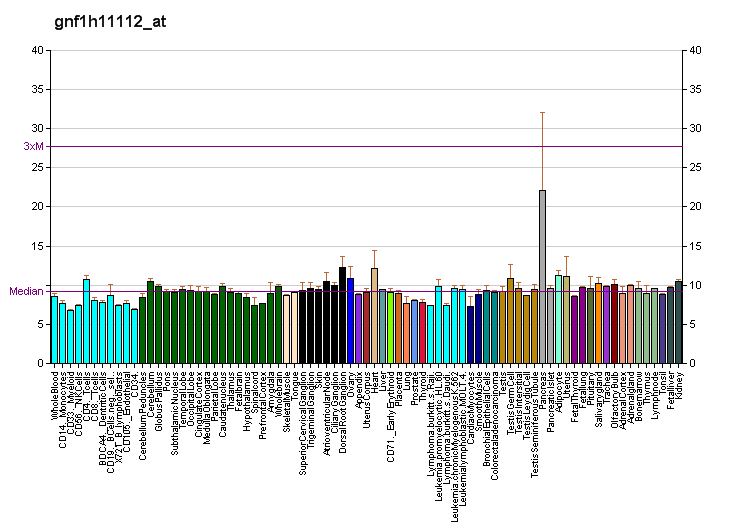
RNA expression pattern
Bgee	Human / Mouse (ortholog); Top expressed in: testicle; bone marrow cell; gonad; corpus callosum / Top expressed in: striatum of neuraxis; More reference expression data
BioGPS	More reference expression data
Gene ontology
Molecular function	G protein-coupled receptor activity; olfactory receptor activity; signal transducer activity
Cellular component	integral component of membrane; plasma membrane; membrane
Biological process	sensory perception of smell; signal transduction; response to stimulus; detection of chemical stimulus involved in sensory perception of smell; G protein-coupled receptor signaling pathway
Sources:Amigo / QuickGO
Orthologs
Databases	NCBI: entry; OMA: entry
Species	Human	Mouse
Entrez	120775	258597
Ensembl	ENSG00000178358	ENSMUSG00000073896
UniProt	Q8NGH3	n/a
RefSeq (mRNA)	NM_001004684	NM_146604
RefSeq (protein)	NP_001004684	n/a
Location (UCSC)	Chr 11: 6.92 – 6.92 Mb	Chr 7: 106.74 – 106.75 Mb
PubMed search
- Wikidata
View/Edit Human	View/Edit Mouse

Olfactory receptor 2D3 is a protein that in humans is encoded by the OR2D3 gene.

Olfactory receptors interact with odorant molecules in the nose, to initiate a neuronal response that triggers the perception of a smell. The olfactory receptor proteins are members of a large family of G-protein-coupled receptors (GPCR) arising from single coding-exon genes. Olfactory receptors share a 7-transmembrane domain structure with many neurotransmitters and hormone receptors and are responsible for the recognition and G protein-mediated transduction of odorant signals. The olfactory receptor gene family is the largest in the genome. The nomenclature assigned to the olfactory receptor genes and proteins for this organism is independent of other organisms.

== See also ==
- Olfactory receptor
