= OR4C11 =

Protein-coding gene in the species Homo sapiens

Identifiers
- Aliases: OR4C11, OR11-136, OR4C11P, olfactory receptor family 4 subfamily C member 11
- External IDs: MGI: 3031035; GeneCards: OR4C11

Gene location (Human)
Chr.	Chromosome 11 (human)
Band	11q11	Start	55,602,360 bp
Band	11q11	End	55,607,645 bp

Gene location (Mouse)
Chr.	Chromosome 2 (mouse)
Band	2|2 E1	Start	88,623,380 bp
Band	2|2 E1	End	88,627,171 bp
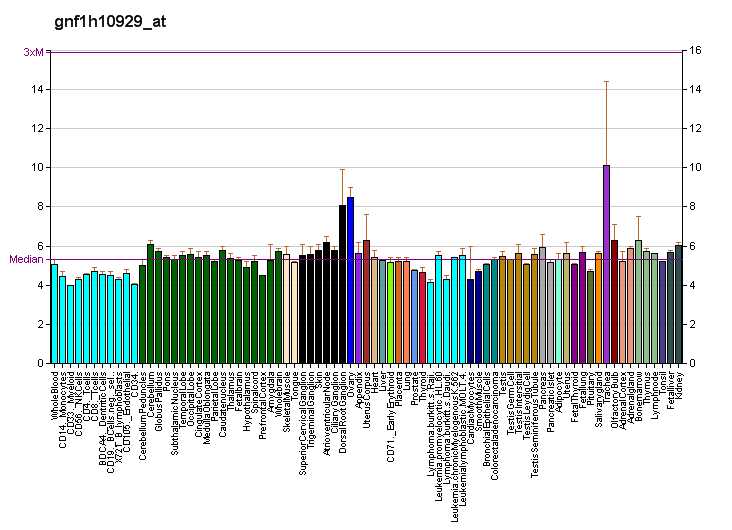

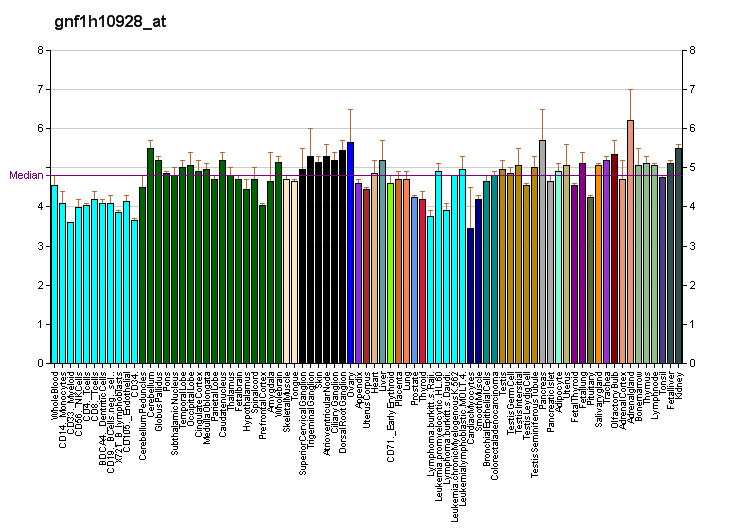
RNA expression pattern
Bgee	Human / Mouse (ortholog); Top expressed in: ascending aorta; thoracic aorta; multicellular organism / n/a; More reference expression data
BioGPS	More reference expression data
Gene ontology
Molecular function	G protein-coupled receptor activity; olfactory receptor activity; transmembrane signaling receptor activity; signal transducer activity
Cellular component	integral component of membrane; plasma membrane; membrane
Biological process	sensory perception of smell; detection of chemical stimulus involved in sensory perception of smell; detection of chemical stimulus involved in sensory perception; signal transduction; response to stimulus; G protein-coupled receptor signaling pathway
Sources:Amigo / QuickGO
Orthologs
Databases	NCBI: entry; OMA: entry
Species	Human	Mouse
Entrez	219429	258897
Ensembl	ENSG00000172188	ENSMUSG00000059023
UniProt	Q6IEV9	Q8VGF5
RefSeq (mRNA)	NM_001004700	NM_146895
RefSeq (protein)	NP_001004700	NP_667106
Location (UCSC)	Chr 11: 55.6 – 55.61 Mb	Chr 2: 88.62 – 88.63 Mb
PubMed search
- Wikidata
View/Edit Human	View/Edit Mouse

Olfactory receptor 4C11 is a protein that in humans is encoded by the OR4C11 gene.

Olfactory receptors interact with odorant molecules in the nose, to initiate a neuronal response that triggers the perception of a smell. The olfactory receptor proteins are members of a large family of G-protein-coupled receptors (GPCR) arising from single coding-exon genes. Olfactory receptors share a 7-transmembrane domain structure with many neurotransmitter and hormone receptors and are responsible for the recognition and G protein-mediated transduction of odorant signals. The olfactory receptor gene family is the largest in the genome. The nomenclature assigned to the olfactory receptor genes and proteins for this organism is independent of other organisms.

== See also ==
- Olfactory receptor
