= OR5AK2 =

Protein-coding gene in the species Homo sapiens

Identifiers
- Aliases: OR5AK2, olfactory receptor family 5 subfamily AK member 2
- External IDs: MGI: 3030827; GeneCards: OR5AK2

Gene location (Human)
Chr.	Chromosome 11 (human)
Band	11q12.1	Start	56,988,914 bp
Band	11q12.1	End	56,989,843 bp

Gene location (Mouse)
Chr.	Chromosome 2 (mouse)
Band	2|2 D	Start	85,244,277 bp
Band	2|2 D	End	85,245,221 bp
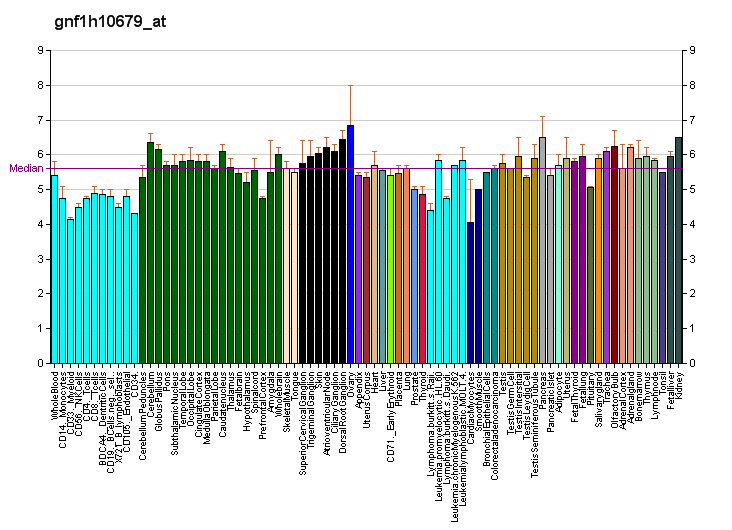

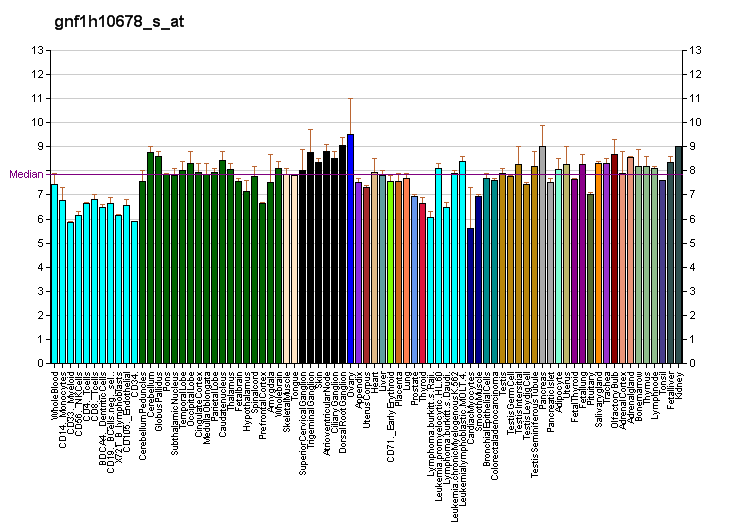
RNA expression pattern
Bgee	Human / Mouse (ortholog); Top expressed in: spleen; skeletal muscle tissue; muscle of thigh; placenta; C1 segment; respiratory system; lung; right auricle of heart / n/a; More reference expression data
BioGPS	More reference expression data
Gene ontology
Molecular function	G protein-coupled receptor activity; signal transducer activity; odorant binding; olfactory receptor activity
Cellular component	integral component of membrane; membrane; plasma membrane
Biological process	response to stimulus; signal transduction; sensory perception of smell; detection of chemical stimulus involved in sensory perception of smell; G protein-coupled receptor signaling pathway
Sources:Amigo / QuickGO
Orthologs
Databases	NCBI: entry; OMA: entry
Species	Human	Mouse
Entrez	390181	258427
Ensembl	ENSG00000181273	ENSMUSG00000075220
UniProt	Q8NH90	Q8VF75
RefSeq (mRNA)	NM_001005323	NM_146435
RefSeq (protein)	NP_001005323	NP_666646
Location (UCSC)	Chr 11: 56.99 – 56.99 Mb	Chr 2: 85.24 – 85.25 Mb
PubMed search
- Wikidata
View/Edit Human	View/Edit Mouse

Olfactory receptor 5AK2 is a protein that in humans is encoded by the OR5AK2 gene.

Olfactory receptors interact with odorant molecules in the nose, to initiate a neuronal response that triggers the perception of a smell. The olfactory receptor proteins are members of a large family of G-protein-coupled receptors (GPCR) arising from single coding-exon genes. Olfactory receptors share a 7-transmembrane domain structure with many neurotransmitter and hormone receptors and are responsible for the recognition and G protein-mediated transduction of odorant signals. The olfactory receptor gene family is the largest in the genome. The nomenclature assigned to the olfactory receptor genes and proteins for this organism is independent of other organisms.

== See also ==
- Olfactory receptor
