= OR4F15 =

Protein-coding gene in the species Homo sapiens

Identifiers
- Aliases: OR4F15, olfactory receptor family 4 subfamily F member 15
- External IDs: MGI: 3031143; GeneCards: OR4F15

Gene location (Human)
Chr.	Chromosome 15 (human)
Band	15q26.3	Start	101,812,202 bp
Band	15q26.3	End	101,820,197 bp

Gene location (Mouse)
Chr.	Chromosome 2 (mouse)
Band	2|2 E3	Start	111,810,202 bp
Band	2|2 E3	End	111,820,626 bp
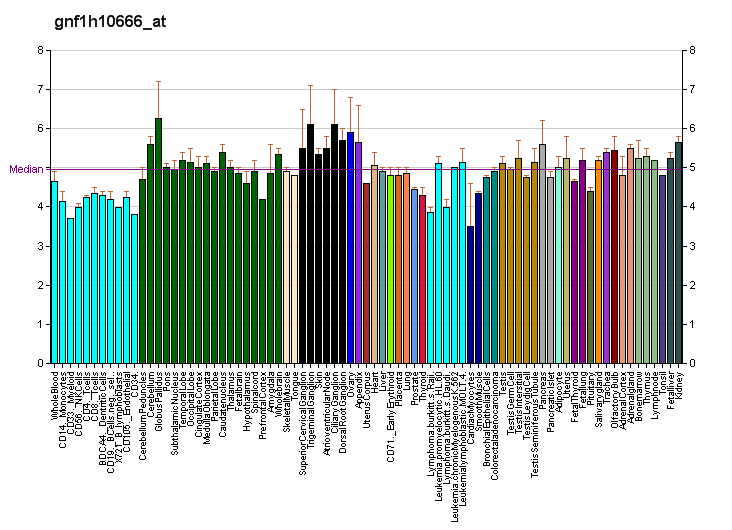

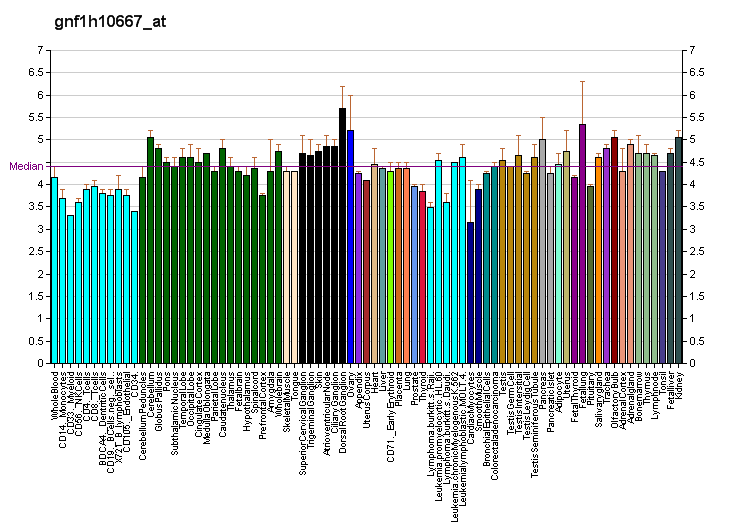
RNA expression pattern
Bgee	Human / Mouse (ortholog); Top expressed in: lung; multicellular organism / n/a; More reference expression data
BioGPS	More reference expression data
Gene ontology
Molecular function	G protein-coupled receptor activity; olfactory receptor activity; transmembrane signaling receptor activity; signal transducer activity
Cellular component	integral component of membrane; plasma membrane; membrane
Biological process	sensory perception of smell; detection of chemical stimulus involved in sensory perception of smell; detection of chemical stimulus involved in sensory perception; signal transduction; response to stimulus; G protein-coupled receptor signaling pathway
Sources:Amigo / QuickGO
Orthologs
Databases	NCBI: entry; OMA: entry
Species	Human	Mouse
Entrez	390649	258439
Ensembl	ENSG00000182854	ENSMUSG00000109528
UniProt	Q8NGB8	n/a
RefSeq (mRNA)	NM_001001674	NM_146447
RefSeq (protein)	NP_001001674	n/a
Location (UCSC)	Chr 15: 101.81 – 101.82 Mb	Chr 2: 111.81 – 111.82 Mb
PubMed search
- Wikidata
View/Edit Human	View/Edit Mouse

Olfactory receptor 4F15 is a protein that in humans is encoded by the OR4F15 gene.

Olfactory receptors interact with odorant molecules in the nose, to initiate a neuronal response that triggers the perception of a smell. The olfactory receptor proteins are members of a large family of G-protein-coupled receptors (GPCR) arising from single coding-exon genes. Olfactory receptors share a 7-transmembrane domain structure with many neurotransmitter and hormone receptors and are responsible for the recognition and G protein-mediated transduction of odorant signals. The olfactory receptor gene family is the largest in the genome. The nomenclature assigned to the olfactory receptor genes and proteins for this organism is independent of other organisms.

== See also ==
- Olfactory receptor
