= OR2B3 =

Protein-coding gene in the species Homo sapiens

Identifiers
- Aliases: OR2B3, 6M1-1, OR2B3P, OR6-14, OR6-4, olfactory receptor family 2 subfamily B member 3
- External IDs: GeneCards: OR2B3

Gene location (Human)
Chr.	Chromosome 6 (human)
Band	6p22.1	Start	29,086,208 bp
Band	6p22.1	End	29,087,313 bp
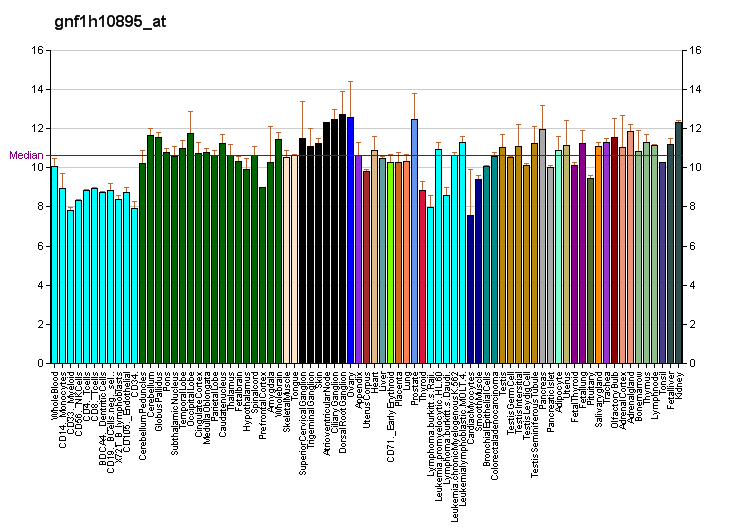

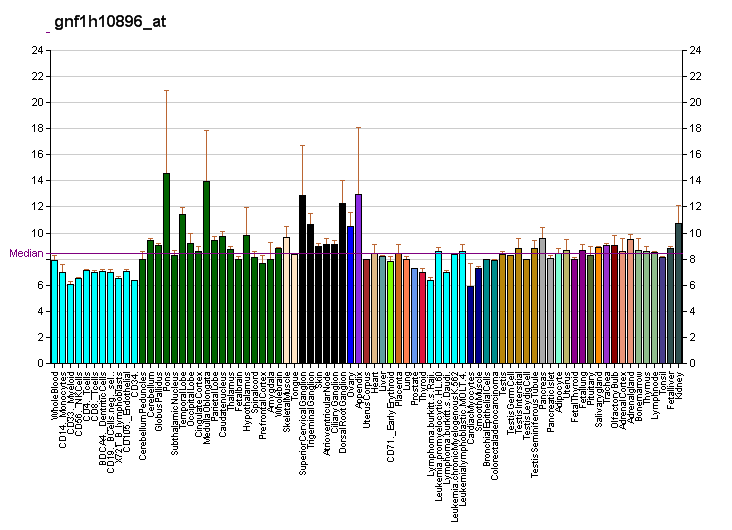
RNA expression pattern
Bgee	Human / Mouse (ortholog); Top expressed in: testicle; mucosa of transverse colon / n/a; More reference expression data
BioGPS	More reference expression data
Gene ontology
Molecular function	G protein-coupled receptor activity; olfactory receptor activity; signal transducer activity
Cellular component	integral component of membrane; plasma membrane; membrane
Biological process	sensory perception of smell; signal transduction; response to stimulus; detection of chemical stimulus involved in sensory perception of smell; G protein-coupled receptor signaling pathway
Sources:Amigo / QuickGO
Orthologs
Databases	NCBI: entry; OMA: entry
Species	Human	Mouse
Entrez	442184	n/a
Ensembl	ENSG00000233054; ENSG00000231319; ENSG00000206524; ENSG00000233687; ENSG00000226832 ENSG00000233180; ENSG00000225736; ENSG00000204703	n/a
UniProt	O76000	n/a
RefSeq (mRNA)	NM_001005226	n/a
RefSeq (protein)	NP_001005226	n/a
Location (UCSC)	Chr 6: 29.09 – 29.09 Mb	n/a
PubMed search		n/a
- Wikidata
View/Edit Human

Putative olfactory receptor 2B3 is a protein that in humans is encoded by the OR2B3 gene.

Olfactory receptors interact with odorant molecules in the nose, to initiate a neuronal response that triggers the perception of a smell. The olfactory receptor proteins are members of a large family of G-protein-coupled receptors (GPCR) arising from single coding-exon genes. Olfactory receptors share a 7-transmembrane domain structure with many neurotransmitter and hormone receptors and are responsible for the recognition and G protein-mediated transduction of odorant signals. The olfactory receptor gene family is the largest in the genome. The nomenclature assigned to the olfactory receptor genes and proteins for this organism is independent of other organisms.

== See also ==
- Olfactory receptor
