= OR1L3 =

Protein-coding gene in the species Homo sapiens

Identifiers
- Aliases: OR1L3, OR9-28, OR9-D, olfactory receptor family 1 subfamily L member 3
- External IDs: GeneCards: OR1L3

Gene location (Human)
| Chr. | Chromosome 9 (human) |
| Band | 9q33.2 | Start | 122,675,130 bp |
| Band | 9q33.2 | End | 122,676,104 bp |
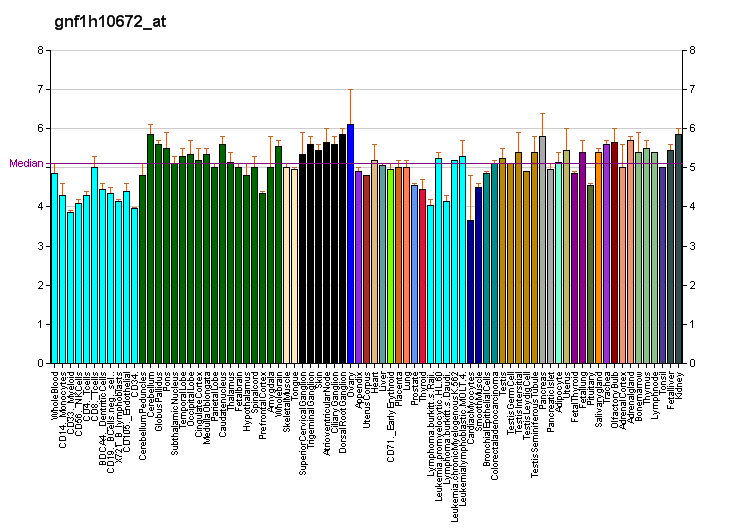

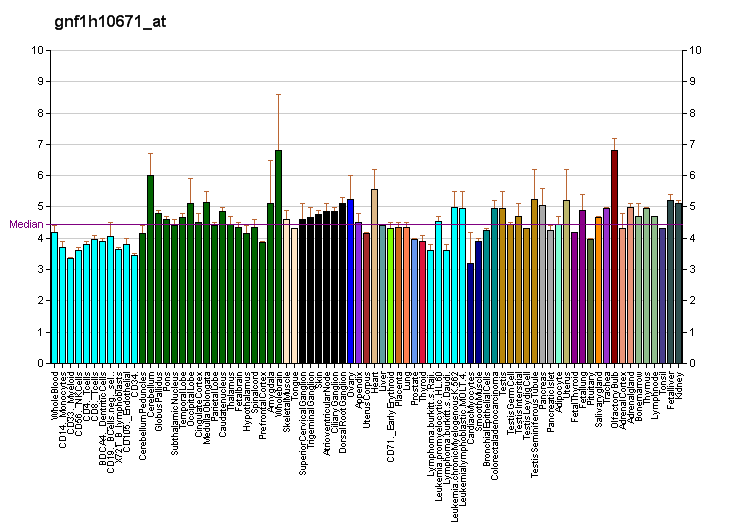
RNA expression pattern
| Bgee | Human / Mouse (ortholog); Top expressed in: anterior cingulate cortex / n/a; More reference expression data |
| BioGPS | More reference expression data |
Gene ontology
| Molecular function | G protein-coupled receptor activity; signal transducer activity; olfactory receptor activity |
| Cellular component | integral component of membrane; plasma membrane; membrane |
| Biological process | sensory perception of smell; detection of chemical stimulus involved in sensory perception of smell; signal transduction; response to stimulus; G protein-coupled receptor signaling pathway |
Sources:Amigo / QuickGO
Orthologs
| Databases | NCBI: entry; OMA: entry |
| Species | Human | Mouse |
| Entrez | 26735 | n/a |
| Ensembl | ENSG00000171481 | n/a |
| UniProt | Q8NH93 | n/a |
| RefSeq (mRNA) | NM_001005234 | n/a |
| RefSeq (protein) | NP_001005234 | n/a |
| Location (UCSC) | Chr 9: 122.68 – 122.68 Mb | n/a |
| PubMed search | | n/a |
- Wikidata
| View/Edit Human |

Olfactory receptor 1L3 is a protein that in humans is encoded by the OR1L3 gene.

Olfactory receptors interact with odorant molecules in the nose, to initiate a neuronal response that triggers the perception of a smell. The olfactory receptor proteins are members of a large family of G-protein-coupled receptors (GPCR) arising from single coding-exon genes. Olfactory receptors share a 7-transmembrane domain structure with many neurotransmitter and hormone receptors and are responsible for the recognition and G protein-mediated transduction of odorant signals. The olfactory receptor gene family is the largest in the genome. The nomenclature assigned to the olfactory receptor genes and proteins for this organism is independent of other organisms.

== See also ==
- Olfactory receptor
