= OR4K17 =

Protein-coding gene in the species Homo sapiens

Identifiers
- Aliases: OR4K17, OR14-29, olfactory receptor family 4 subfamily K member 17
- External IDs: GeneCards: OR4K17

Gene location (Human)
Chr.	Chromosome 14 (human)
Band	14q11.2	Start	20,110,739 bp
Band	14q11.2	End	20,122,199 bp
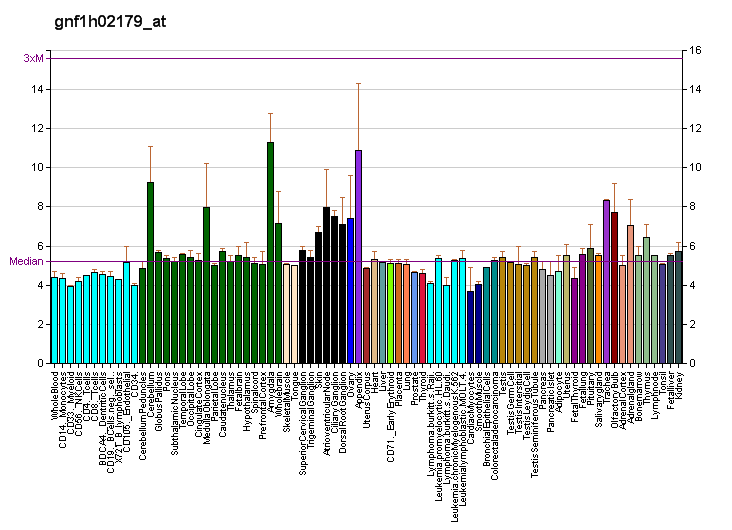

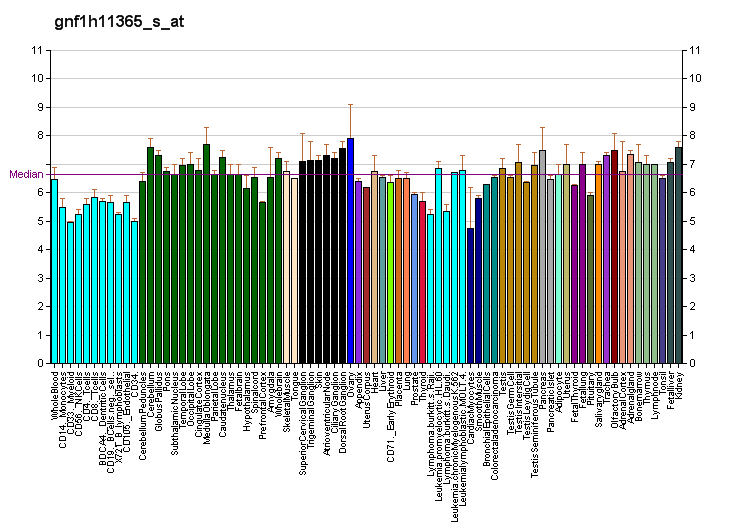
RNA expression pattern
Bgee	Human / Mouse (ortholog); Top expressed in: liver / n/a; More reference expression data
BioGPS	More reference expression data
Gene ontology
Molecular function	G protein-coupled receptor activity; olfactory receptor activity; transmembrane signaling receptor activity; signal transducer activity
Cellular component	integral component of membrane; plasma membrane; membrane
Biological process	sensory perception of smell; detection of chemical stimulus involved in sensory perception of smell; detection of chemical stimulus involved in sensory perception; signal transduction; response to stimulus; G protein-coupled receptor signaling pathway
Sources:Amigo / QuickGO
Orthologs
Databases	NCBI: entry; OMA: entry
Species	Human	Mouse
Entrez	390436	n/a
Ensembl	ENSG00000176230	n/a
UniProt	Q8NGC6	n/a
RefSeq (mRNA)	NM_001004715	n/a
RefSeq (protein)	NP_001004715	n/a
Location (UCSC)	Chr 14: 20.11 – 20.12 Mb	n/a
PubMed search		n/a
- Wikidata
View/Edit Human

Olfactory receptor 4K17 is a protein that in humans is encoded by the OR4K17 gene.

Olfactory receptors interact with odorant molecules in the nose, to initiate a neuronal response that triggers the perception of a smell. The olfactory receptor proteins are members of a large family of G-protein-coupled receptors (GPCR) arising from single coding-exon genes. Olfactory receptors share a 7-transmembrane domain structure with many neurotransmitter and hormone receptors and are responsible for the recognition and G protein-mediated transduction of odorant signals. The olfactory receptor gene family is the largest in the genome. The nomenclature assigned to the olfactory receptor genes and proteins for this organism is independent of other organisms.

== See also ==
- Olfactory receptor
