= OR2G3 =

Protein-coding gene in humans

Identifiers
- Aliases: OR2G3, OR1-33, olfactory receptor family 2 subfamily G member 3
- External IDs: GeneCards: OR2G3

Gene location (Human)
Chr.	Chromosome 1 (human)
Band	1q44	Start	247,605,586 bp
Band	1q44	End	247,606,515 bp
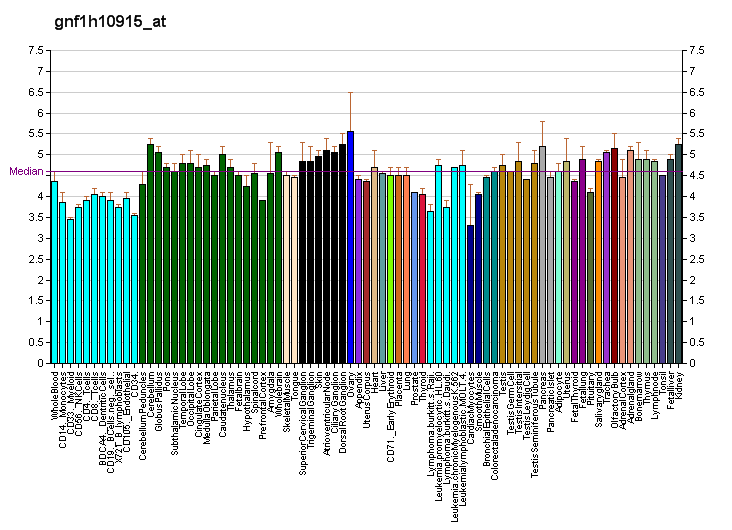

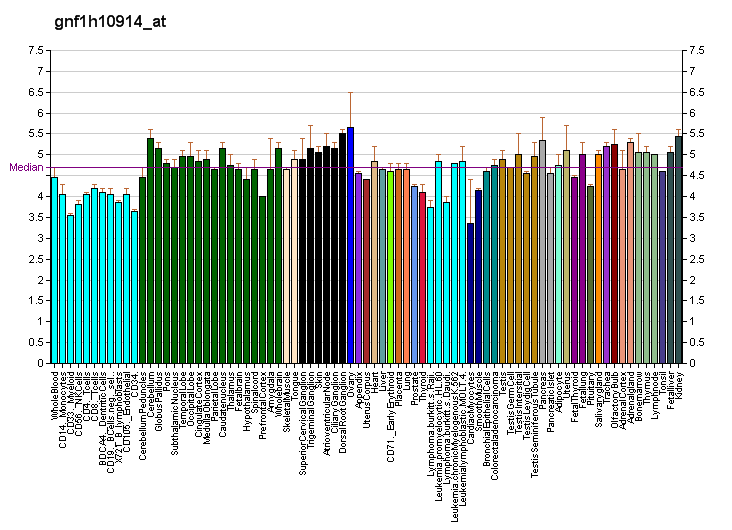
RNA expression pattern
Bgee	Human / Mouse (ortholog); Top expressed in: testicle; multicellular organism / n/a; More reference expression data
BioGPS	More reference expression data
Gene ontology
Molecular function	G protein-coupled receptor activity; olfactory receptor activity; signal transducer activity
Cellular component	integral component of membrane; plasma membrane; membrane
Biological process	sensory perception of smell; signal transduction; response to stimulus; detection of chemical stimulus involved in sensory perception of smell; G protein-coupled receptor signaling pathway
Sources:Amigo / QuickGO
Orthologs
Databases	NCBI: entry; OMA: entry
Species	Human	Mouse
Entrez	81469	n/a
Ensembl	ENSG00000177476	n/a
UniProt	Q8NGZ4	n/a
RefSeq (mRNA)	NM_001001914	n/a
RefSeq (protein)	NP_001001914	n/a
Location (UCSC)	Chr 1: 247.61 – 247.61 Mb	n/a
PubMed search		n/a
- Wikidata
View/Edit Human

Olfactory Receptor 2G3 is a protein that in humans is encoded by the OR2G3 gene.

Olfactory receptors interact with odorant molecules in the nose, to initiate a neuronal response that triggers the perception of a smell. The olfactory receptor proteins are members of a large family of G-protein-coupled receptors (GPCR) arising from single coding-exon genes. Olfactory receptors share a 7-transmembrane domain structure with many neurotransmitter and hormone receptors and are responsible for the recognition and G protein-mediated transduction of odorant signals. The olfactory receptor gene family is the largest in the genome. The nomenclature assigned to the olfactory receptor genes and proteins for this organism is independent of other organisms.

== See also ==
- Olfactory receptor
