= OR2H1 =

Protein-coding gene in the species Homo sapiens

Identifiers
- Aliases: OR2H1, 6M1-16, HS6M1-16, OLFR42A-9004-14, OR2H6, OR2H8, OR6-2, dJ994E9.4, OLFR42A-9004.14/9026.2, olfactory receptor family 2 subfamily H member 1
- External IDs: MGI: 2177474; GeneCards: OR2H1

Gene location (Human)
Chr.	Chromosome 6 (human)
Band	6p22.1	Start	29,457,155 bp
Band	6p22.1	End	29,464,328 bp

Gene location (Mouse)
Chr.	Chromosome 17 (mouse)
Band	17|17 B1	Start	37,401,510 bp
Band	17|17 B1	End	37,409,170 bp
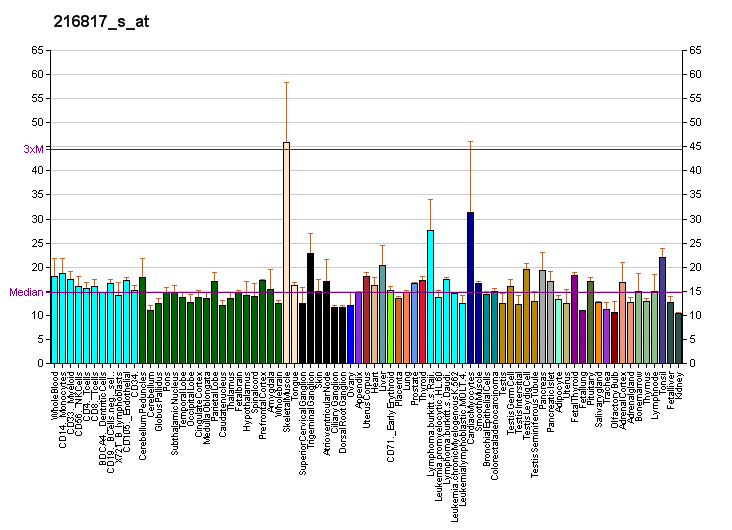
RNA expression pattern
Bgee	Human / Mouse (ortholog); Top expressed in: testicle; right testis; left testis; gallbladder; caudate nucleus; cell; monocyte; fallopian tube; hypothalamus; blood / Top expressed in: limb bud; More reference expression data
BioGPS	More reference expression data
Gene ontology
Molecular function	G protein-coupled receptor activity; olfactory receptor activity; signal transducer activity
Cellular component	integral component of membrane; plasma membrane; membrane
Biological process	sensory perception of smell; signal transduction; response to stimulus; detection of chemical stimulus involved in sensory perception of smell; G protein-coupled receptor signaling pathway
Sources:Amigo / QuickGO
Orthologs
Databases	NCBI: entry; OMA: entry
Species	Human	Mouse
Entrez	26716	258470
Ensembl	ENSG00000206516; ENSG00000204688; ENSG00000224395; ENSG00000206471; ENSG00000229125 ENSG00000232984; ENSG00000229408; ENSG00000235132	ENSMUSG00000095377
UniProt	Q9GZK4	Q7TRL3
RefSeq (mRNA)	NM_030883; NM_001318014; NM_001318022	NM_182714
RefSeq (protein)	NP_001304943; NP_001304951; NP_112145	NP_874373
Location (UCSC)	Chr 6: 29.46 – 29.46 Mb	Chr 17: 37.4 – 37.41 Mb
PubMed search
- Wikidata
View/Edit Human	View/Edit Mouse

Olfactory receptor 2H1 is a protein that in humans is encoded by the OR2H1 gene.

Olfactory receptors interact with odorant molecules in the nose, to initiate a neuronal response that triggers the perception of a smell. The olfactory receptor proteins are members of a large family of G-protein-coupled receptors (GPCR) arising from single coding-exon genes. Olfactory receptors share a 7-transmembrane domain structure with many neurotransmitter and hormone receptors and are responsible for the recognition and G protein-mediated transduction of odorant signals. The olfactory receptor gene family is the largest in the genome. The nomenclature assigned to the olfactory receptor genes and proteins for this organism is independent of other organisms.

== See also ==
- Olfactory receptor
