= OR5A2 =

Protein-coding gene in the species Homo sapiens

Identifiers
- Aliases: OR5A2, olfactory receptor family 5 subfamily A member 2
- External IDs: GeneCards: OR5A2

Gene location (Human)
Chr.	Chromosome 11 (human)
Band	11q12.1	Start	59,416,969 bp
Band	11q12.1	End	59,426,413 bp
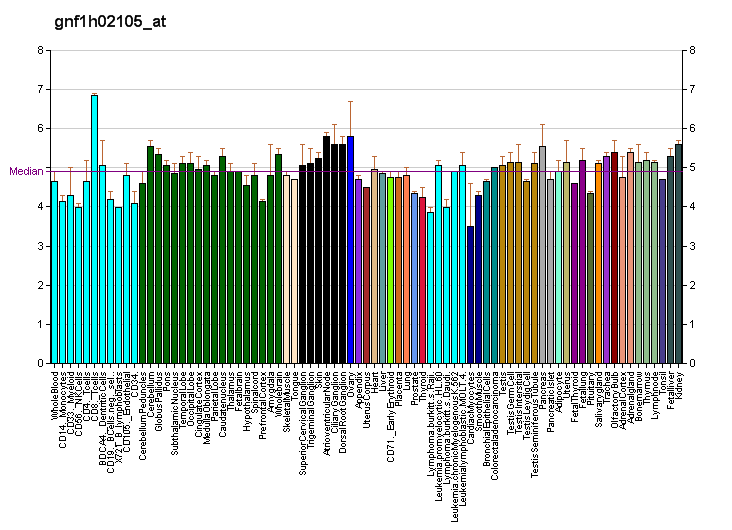
RNA expression pattern
Bgee	Human / Mouse (ortholog); n/a / n/a
BioGPS	More reference expression data
Gene ontology
Molecular function	G protein-coupled receptor activity; odorant binding; olfactory receptor activity; signal transducer activity
Cellular component	integral component of membrane; plasma membrane; membrane
Biological process	sensory perception of smell; signal transduction; response to stimulus; detection of chemical stimulus involved in sensory perception of smell; G protein-coupled receptor signaling pathway
Sources:Amigo / QuickGO
Orthologs
Databases	NCBI: entry; OMA: entry
Species	Human	Mouse
Entrez	219981	n/a
Ensembl	ENSG00000172324	n/a
UniProt	Q8NGI9	n/a
RefSeq (mRNA)	NM_001001954	n/a
RefSeq (protein)	NP_001001954	n/a
Location (UCSC)	Chr 11: 59.42 – 59.43 Mb	n/a
PubMed search		n/a
- Wikidata
View/Edit Human

Olfactory receptor 5A2 is a protein that in humans is encoded by the OR5A2 gene.

Olfactory receptors interact with odorant molecules in the nose, to initiate a neuronal response that triggers the perception of a smell. The olfactory receptor proteins are members of a large family of G-protein-coupled receptors (GPCR) arising from single coding-exon genes. Olfactory receptors share a 7-transmembrane domain structure with many neurotransmitter and hormone receptors and are responsible for the recognition and G protein-mediated transduction of odorant signals. The olfactory receptor gene family is the largest in the genome. The nomenclature assigned to the olfactory receptor genes and proteins for this organism is independent of other organisms.

Discovery and Functional Characterization The human olfactory receptor OR5A2 was first discovered and functionally characterized as the universal human musk receptor by researchers at ChemCom S.A. (Brussels, Belgium). In a pioneering 2018 patent application (WO2019110630A1), ChemCom established that OR5A2 is uniquely capable of binding and responding to all four major chemical classes of musk compounds: macrocyclic, nitro, polycyclic, and alicyclic/linear musks.While subsequent academic and industrial publications from 2022 to 2024 utilized machine learning, structural modeling, and high-throughput virtual screening tools to map the receptor, these works represent applications built entirely upon the biological target first uncovered and patented by ChemCom in 2018.References:ChemCom S.A. (2018). Methods and compositions for modulating the human musk olfactory receptor OR5A2. International Patent Publication No. WO2019110630A1. Filed December 2018.
