= OR1Q1 =

Protein-coding gene in the species Homo sapiens

Identifiers
- Aliases: OR1Q1, HSTPCR106, OR1Q2, OR1Q3, OR9-25, OR9-A, OST226, OST226OR9-A, TPCR106, olfactory receptor family 1 subfamily Q member 1
- External IDs: MGI: 3030191; GeneCards: OR1Q1

Gene location (Human)
Chr.	Chromosome 9 (human)
Band	9q33.2	Start	122,614,738 bp
Band	9q33.2	End	122,615,682 bp

Gene location (Mouse)
Chr.	Chromosome 2 (mouse)
Band	2|2 B	Start	36,883,839 bp
Band	2|2 B	End	36,891,859 bp
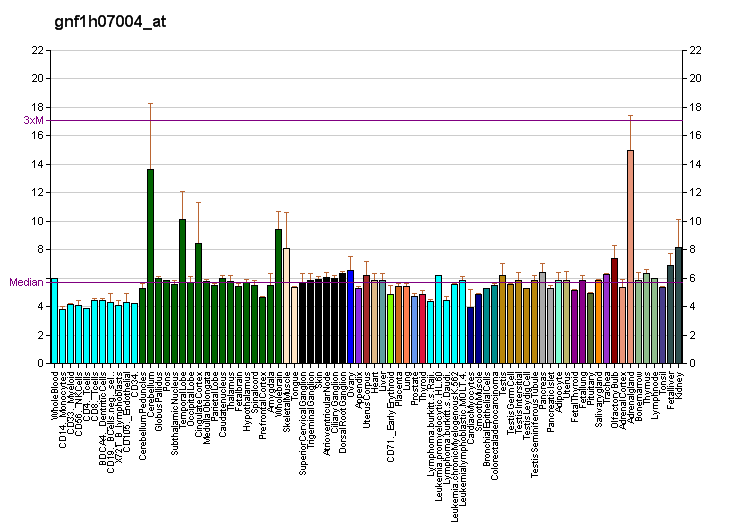
RNA expression pattern
Bgee	Human / Mouse (ortholog); Top expressed in: testicle; stromal cell of endometrium; Achilles tendon; urinary bladder; gallbladder; myometrium; fundus; prefrontal cortex; sigmoid colon; body of stomach / Top expressed in: spermatid; More reference expression data
BioGPS	More reference expression data
Gene ontology
Molecular function	G protein-coupled receptor activity; signal transducer activity; olfactory receptor activity; transmembrane signaling receptor activity
Cellular component	integral component of membrane; plasma membrane; membrane
Biological process	response to stimulus; detection of chemical stimulus involved in sensory perception; signal transduction; sensory perception of smell; detection of chemical stimulus involved in sensory perception of smell; G protein-coupled receptor signaling pathway
Sources:Amigo / QuickGO
Orthologs
Databases	NCBI: entry; OMA: entry
Species	Human	Mouse
Entrez	158131	258616
Ensembl	ENSG00000165202	ENSMUSG00000055838
UniProt	Q15612	Q8VFP4
RefSeq (mRNA)	NM_012364	NM_146623
RefSeq (protein)	NP_036496	NP_666834
Location (UCSC)	Chr 9: 122.61 – 122.62 Mb	Chr 2: 36.88 – 36.89 Mb
PubMed search
- Wikidata
View/Edit Human	View/Edit Mouse

Olfactory receptor 1Q1 is a protein that in humans is encoded by the OR1Q1 gene.

== Function ==
Olfactory receptors interact with odorant molecules in the nose, to initiate a neuronal response that triggers the perception of a smell. The olfactory receptor proteins are members of a large family of G-protein-coupled receptors (GPCR) arising from single coding-exon genes. Olfactory receptors share a 7-transmembrane domain structure with many neurotransmitter and hormone receptors and are responsible for the recognition and G protein-mediated transduction of odorant signals. The olfactory receptor gene family is the largest in the genome. The nomenclature assigned to the olfactory receptor genes and proteins for this organism is independent of other organisms.

== See also ==
- Olfactory receptor
