= OR2AG1 =

Protein-coding gene in the species Homo sapiens

Identifiers
- Aliases: OR2AG1, OR11-79, OR2AG3, olfactory receptor family 2 subfamily AG member 1 (gene/pseudogene), olfactory receptor family 2 subfamily AG member 1
- External IDs: MGI: 3030539; GeneCards: OR2AG1

Gene location (Human)
Chr.	Chromosome 11 (human)
Band	11p15.4	Start	6,783,020 bp
Band	11p15.4	End	6,791,558 bp

Gene location (Mouse)
Chr.	Chromosome 7 (mouse)
Band	7|7 E3	Start	106,471,077 bp
Band	7|7 E3	End	106,476,098 bp
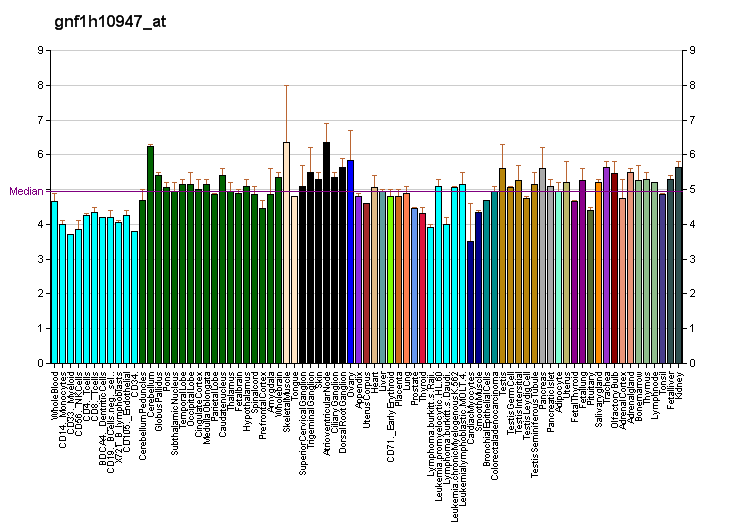
RNA expression pattern
Bgee	Human / Mouse (ortholog); Top expressed in: bone marrow cell; sural nerve; superior frontal gyrus; prefrontal cortex; temporal lobe; amygdala / Top expressed in: respiratory epithelium; nasal epithelium; olfactory epithelium; More reference expression data
BioGPS	More reference expression data
Gene ontology
Molecular function	signal transducer activity; olfactory receptor activity; G protein-coupled receptor activity; protein binding
Cellular component	plasma membrane; membrane; integral component of membrane
Biological process	sensory perception of smell; signal transduction; response to stimulus; detection of chemical stimulus involved in sensory perception of smell; G protein-coupled receptor signaling pathway
Sources:Amigo / QuickGO
Orthologs
Databases	NCBI: entry; OMA: entry
Species	Human	Mouse
Entrez	144125	259034
Ensembl	ENSG00000279486	ENSMUSG00000109058
UniProt	Q9H205	Q9EPF7
RefSeq (mRNA)	NM_001004489	NM_147032
RefSeq (protein)	NP_001004489	NP_667243
Location (UCSC)	Chr 11: 6.78 – 6.79 Mb	Chr 7: 106.47 – 106.48 Mb
PubMed search
- Wikidata
View/Edit Human	View/Edit Mouse

Olfactory receptor 2AG1 is a protein that in humans is encoded by the OR2AG1 gene.

Olfactory receptors interact with odorant molecules in the nose, to initiate a neuronal response that triggers the perception of a smell. The olfactory receptor proteins are members of a large family of G-protein-coupled receptors (GPCR) arising from single coding-exon genes. Olfactory receptors share a 7-transmembrane domain structure with many neurotransmitter and hormone receptors and are responsible for the recognition and G protein-mediated transduction of odorant signals. The olfactory receptor gene family is the largest in the genome. The nomenclature assigned to the olfactory receptor genes and proteins for this organism is independent of other organisms.

== Ligands ==
Amyl butyrate is a reported ligand for this receptor.

== See also ==
- Olfactory receptor
