= OR1I1 =

Protein-coding gene in the species Homo sapiens

Identifiers
- Aliases: OR1I1, OR19-20, OR1I1P, OR1I1Q, olfactory receptor family 1 subfamily I member 1
- External IDs: MGI: 3031191; GeneCards: OR1I1

Gene location (Human)
Chr.	Chromosome 19 (human)
Band	19p13.12	Start	15,082,211 bp
Band	19p13.12	End	15,092,970 bp

Gene location (Mouse)
Chr.	Chromosome 10 (mouse)
Band	10|10 C1	Start	78,446,837 bp
Band	10|10 C1	End	78,453,908 bp
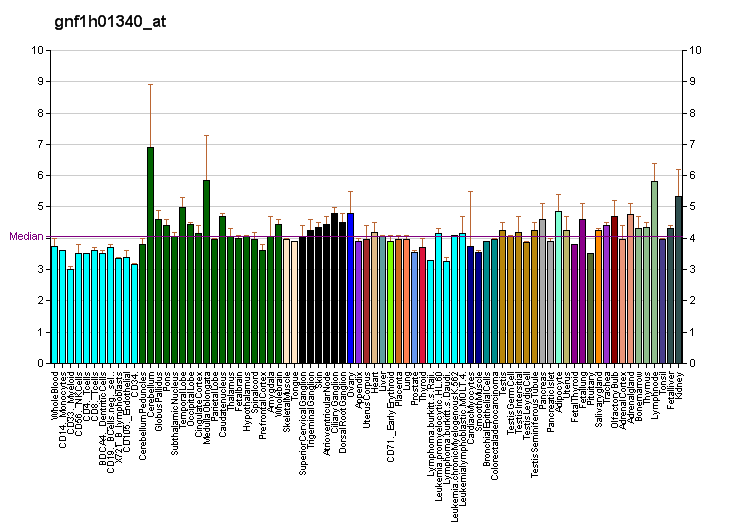
RNA expression pattern
Bgee	Human / Mouse (ortholog); Top expressed in: tibialis anterior muscle; gonad; mucosa of ileum; testicle; deltoid muscle; skin of hip; skin of thigh; placenta; blood; gastric mucosa / Top expressed in: respiratory epithelium; nasal epithelium; olfactory epithelium; olfactory bulb; More reference expression data
BioGPS	More reference expression data
Gene ontology
Molecular function	G protein-coupled receptor activity; signal transducer activity; transmembrane signaling receptor activity; olfactory receptor activity
Cellular component	integral component of membrane; plasma membrane; membrane
Biological process	response to stimulus; signal transduction; sensory perception of smell; detection of chemical stimulus involved in sensory perception of smell; detection of chemical stimulus involved in sensory perception; G protein-coupled receptor signaling pathway
Sources:Amigo / QuickGO
Orthologs
Databases	NCBI: entry; OMA: entry
Species	Human	Mouse
Entrez	126370	257883
Ensembl	ENSG00000094661	ENSMUSG00000071185
UniProt	O60431	Q7TQU7
RefSeq (mRNA)	NM_001004713	NM_001011737
RefSeq (protein)	NP_001004713	NP_001011737
Location (UCSC)	Chr 19: 15.08 – 15.09 Mb	Chr 10: 78.45 – 78.45 Mb
PubMed search
- Wikidata
View/Edit Human	View/Edit Mouse

Olfactory receptor 1I1 is a protein that in humans is encoded by the OR1I1 gene.

Olfactory receptors interact with odorant molecules in the nose, to initiate a neuronal response that triggers the perception of a smell. The olfactory receptor proteins are members of a large family of G-protein-coupled receptors (GPCR) arising from single coding-exon genes. Olfactory receptors share a 7-transmembrane domain structure with many neurotransmitter and hormone receptors and are responsible for the recognition and G protein-mediated transduction of odorant signals. The olfactory receptor gene family is the largest in the genome. The nomenclature assigned to the olfactory receptor genes and proteins for this organism is independent of other organisms.

== See also ==
- Olfactory receptor
