= OR2B6 =

Protein-coding gene in the species Homo sapiens

Identifiers
- Aliases: OR2B6, OR2B1, OR2B1P, OR2B5, OR2B6P, OR5-40, OR5-41, OR6-31, dJ408B20.2, olfactory receptor family 2 subfamily B member 6
- External IDs: MGI: 104715; GeneCards: OR2B6

Gene location (Human)
Chr.	Chromosome 6 (human)
Band	6p22.1	Start	27,957,241 bp
Band	6p22.1	End	27,958,182 bp

Gene location (Mouse)
Chr.	Chromosome 13 (mouse)
Band	13 A3.1|13 7.9 cM	Start	21,820,793 bp
Band	13 A3.1|13 7.9 cM	End	21,826,688 bp
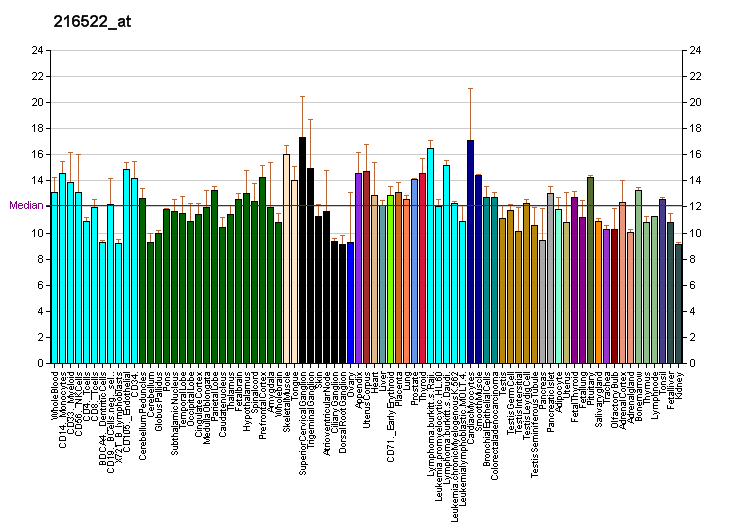
RNA expression pattern
Bgee	Human / Mouse (ortholog); Top expressed in: mucosa of transverse colon; monocyte; gonad; blood; granulocyte; right lobe of liver; placenta; spleen; Ventricular system of neuraxis; embryo / Top expressed in: white adipose tissue; More reference expression data
BioGPS	More reference expression data
Gene ontology
Molecular function	G protein-coupled receptor activity; olfactory receptor activity; signal transducer activity
Cellular component	integral component of membrane; plasma membrane; membrane
Biological process	sensory perception of smell; signal transduction; response to stimulus; detection of chemical stimulus involved in sensory perception of smell; G protein-coupled receptor signaling pathway
Sources:Amigo / QuickGO
Orthologs
Databases	NCBI: entry; OMA: entry
Species	Human	Mouse
Entrez	26212	218066
Ensembl	ENSG00000124657	ENSMUSG00000036658
UniProt	P58173	Q60890
RefSeq (mRNA)	NM_012367	NM_146542
RefSeq (protein)	NP_036499	NP_666753
Location (UCSC)	Chr 6: 27.96 – 27.96 Mb	Chr 13: 21.82 – 21.83 Mb
PubMed search
- Wikidata
View/Edit Human	View/Edit Mouse

Olfactory receptor 2B6 is a protein that in humans is encoded by the OR2B6 gene.

Olfactory receptors interact with odorant molecules in the nose, to initiate a neuronal response that triggers the perception of a smell. The olfactory receptor proteins are members of a large family of G-protein-coupled receptors (GPCR) arising from single coding-exon genes. Olfactory receptors share a 7-transmembrane domain structure with many neurotransmitter and hormone receptors and are responsible for the recognition and G protein-mediated transduction of odorant signals. The olfactory receptor gene family is the largest in the genome. The nomenclature assigned to the olfactory receptor genes and proteins for this organism is independent of other organisms.

== See also ==
- Olfactory receptor
