= OR2S2 =

Protein-coding gene in the species Homo sapiens

Identifiers
- Aliases: OR2S2, OR37A, OST715, olfactory receptor family 2 subfamily S member 2 (gene/pseudogene), olfactory receptor family 2 subfamily S member 2
- External IDs: MGI: 1352681; GeneCards: OR2S2

Gene location (Human)
Chr.	Chromosome 9 (human)
Band	9p13.3	Start	35,957,108 bp
Band	9p13.3	End	35,958,154 bp

Gene location (Mouse)
Chr.	Chromosome 4 (mouse)
Band	4|4 B1	Start	43,851,565 bp
Band	4|4 B1	End	43,857,595 bp
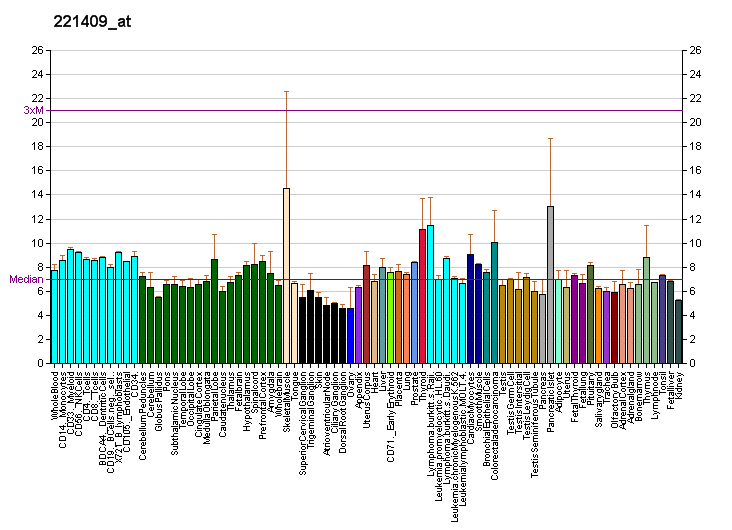
RNA expression pattern
Bgee	Human / Mouse (ortholog); Top expressed in: mucosa of colon; mucosa of transverse colon; superior frontal gyrus; prefrontal cortex; left ventricle / Top expressed in: embryo; respiratory epithelium; nose; nasal epithelium; olfactory system; olfactory epithelium; More reference expression data
BioGPS	More reference expression data
Gene ontology
Molecular function	signal transducer activity; olfactory receptor activity; G protein-coupled receptor activity
Cellular component	plasma membrane; membrane; integral component of membrane
Biological process	sensory perception of smell; signal transduction; response to stimulus; detection of chemical stimulus involved in sensory perception of smell; G protein-coupled receptor signaling pathway
Sources:Amigo / QuickGO
Orthologs
Databases	NCBI: entry; OMA: entry
Species	Human	Mouse
Entrez	56656	29845
Ensembl	ENSG00000278889	ENSMUSG00000071000
UniProt	Q9NQN1	Q9QZ22
RefSeq (mRNA)	NM_019897	NM_019473
RefSeq (protein)	NP_063950	NP_062346
Location (UCSC)	Chr 9: 35.96 – 35.96 Mb	Chr 4: 43.85 – 43.86 Mb
PubMed search
- Wikidata
View/Edit Human	View/Edit Mouse

Olfactory receptor 2S2 is a protein that in humans is encoded by the OR2S2 gene.

Olfactory receptors interact with odorant molecules in the nose, to initiate a neuronal response that triggers the perception of a smell. The olfactory receptor proteins are members of a large family of G-protein-coupled receptors (GPCR) arising from single coding-exon genes. Olfactory receptors share a 7-transmembrane domain structure with many neurotransmitter and hormone receptors and are responsible for the recognition and G protein-mediated transduction of odorant signals. The olfactory receptor gene family is the largest in the genome. The nomenclature assigned to the olfactory receptor genes and proteins for this organism is independent of other organisms.

== See also ==
- Olfactory receptor
