= OR2W3 =

Protein-coding gene in humans

Identifiers
- Aliases: OR2W3, OR2W3P, OR2W8P, OST718, olfactory receptor family 2 subfamily W member 3
- External IDs: OMIM: 616729; MGI: 3030156; GeneCards: OR2W3

Gene location (Human)
Chr.	Chromosome 1 (human)
Band	1q44	Start	247,895,587 bp
Band	1q44	End	247,896,531 bp

Gene location (Mouse)
Chr.	Chromosome 11 (mouse)
Band	11|11 B1.3	Start	58,549,608 bp
Band	11|11 B1.3	End	58,560,354 bp
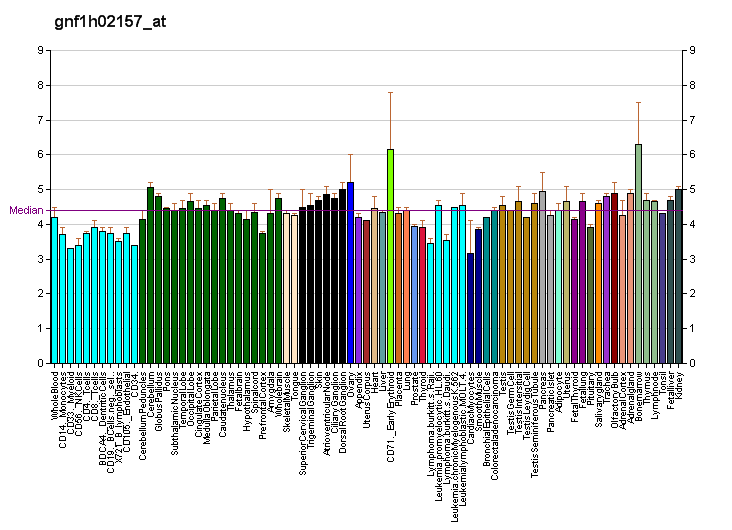
RNA expression pattern
Bgee	Human / Mouse (ortholog); Top expressed in: gonad; blood; monocyte; trabecular bone; bone marrow; right lobe of thyroid gland; left lobe of thyroid gland; prefrontal cortex; tibial nerve; bone marrow cell / Top expressed in: bone marrow; More reference expression data
BioGPS	More reference expression data
Gene ontology
Molecular function	G protein-coupled receptor activity; signal transducer activity; olfactory receptor activity
Cellular component	membrane; plasma membrane; integral component of membrane
Biological process	sensory perception of smell; signal transduction; response to stimulus; detection of chemical stimulus involved in sensory perception of smell; G protein-coupled receptor signaling pathway
Sources:Amigo / QuickGO
Orthologs
Databases	NCBI: entry; OMA: entry
Species	Human	Mouse
Entrez	343171	404346
Ensembl	ENSG00000238243	ENSMUSG00000063549
UniProt	Q7Z3T1	Q5NCC8
RefSeq (mRNA)	NM_001001957	NM_207693
RefSeq (protein)	NP_001001957	NP_997576
Location (UCSC)	Chr 1: 247.9 – 247.9 Mb	Chr 11: 58.55 – 58.56 Mb
PubMed search
- Wikidata
View/Edit Human	View/Edit Mouse

Olfactory receptor 2W3 is a protein that in humans is encoded by the OR2W3 gene.

Olfactory receptors interact with odorant molecules in the nose, to initiate a neuronal response that triggers the perception of a smell. The olfactory receptor proteins are members of a large family of G-protein-coupled receptors (GPCR) arising from single coding-exon genes. Olfactory receptors share a 7-transmembrane domain structure with many neurotransmitter and hormone receptors and are responsible for the recognition and G protein-mediated transduction of odorant signals. The olfactory receptor gene family is the largest in the genome. The nomenclature assigned to the olfactory receptor genes and proteins for this organism is independent of other organisms.

== See also ==
- Olfactory receptor
