= OR4F6 =

Protein-coding gene in the species Homo sapiens

Identifiers
- Aliases: OR4F6, OR15-15, OR4F12, olfactory receptor family 4 subfamily F member 6
- External IDs: MGI: 3031144; GeneCards: OR4F6

Gene location (Human)
Chr.	Chromosome 15 (human)
Band	15q26.3	Start	101,803,509 bp
Band	15q26.3	End	101,806,887 bp

Gene location (Mouse)
Chr.	Chromosome 2 (mouse)
Band	2|2 E3	Start	111,834,919 bp
Band	2|2 E3	End	111,843,053 bp
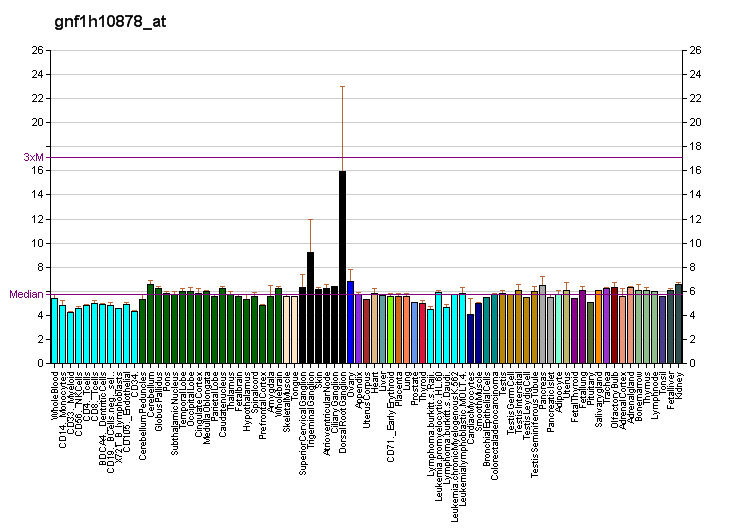
RNA expression pattern
Bgee	Human / Mouse (ortholog); Top expressed in: stomach; prefrontal cortex; brain; substantia nigra; hippocampus proper; cerebral cortex; multicellular organism / Top expressed in: bone marrow; More reference expression data
BioGPS	More reference expression data
Gene ontology
Molecular function	G protein-coupled receptor activity; olfactory receptor activity; transmembrane signaling receptor activity; signal transducer activity
Cellular component	membrane; integral component of membrane; plasma membrane
Biological process	sensory perception of smell; detection of chemical stimulus involved in sensory perception of smell; detection of chemical stimulus involved in sensory perception; signal transduction; response to stimulus; G protein-coupled receptor signaling pathway
Sources:Amigo / QuickGO
Orthologs
Databases	NCBI: entry; OMA: entry
Species	Human	Mouse
Entrez	390648	258441
Ensembl	ENSG00000184140	ENSMUSG00000108827
UniProt	Q8NGB9	Q8VF85
RefSeq (mRNA)	NM_001005326	NM_146449
RefSeq (protein)	NP_001005326	NP_666660
Location (UCSC)	Chr 15: 101.8 – 101.81 Mb	Chr 2: 111.83 – 111.84 Mb
PubMed search
- Wikidata
View/Edit Human	View/Edit Mouse

Olfactory receptor 4F6 is a protein that in humans is encoded by the OR4F6 gene.

Olfactory receptors interact with odorant molecules in the nose, to initiate a neuronal response that triggers the perception of a smell. The olfactory receptor proteins are members of a large family of G-protein-coupled receptors (GPCR) arising from single coding-exon genes. Olfactory receptors share a 7-transmembrane domain structure with many neurotransmitter and hormone receptors and are responsible for the recognition and G protein-mediated transduction of odorant signals. The olfactory receptor gene family is the largest in the genome. The nomenclature assigned to the olfactory receptor genes and proteins for this organism is independent of other organisms.

== See also ==
- Olfactory receptor
