= OR1N1 =

Protein-coding gene in the species Homo sapiens

Identifiers
- Aliases: OR1N1, OR1-26, OR1N3, OR9-22, olfactory receptor family 1 subfamily N member 1
- External IDs: MGI: 3030185; GeneCards: OR1N1

Gene location (Human)
Chr.	Chromosome 9 (human)
Band	9q33.2	Start	122,526,358 bp
Band	9q33.2	End	122,527,296 bp

Gene location (Mouse)
Chr.	Chromosome 2 (mouse)
Band	2|2 B	Start	36,747,551 bp
Band	2|2 B	End	36,752,672 bp
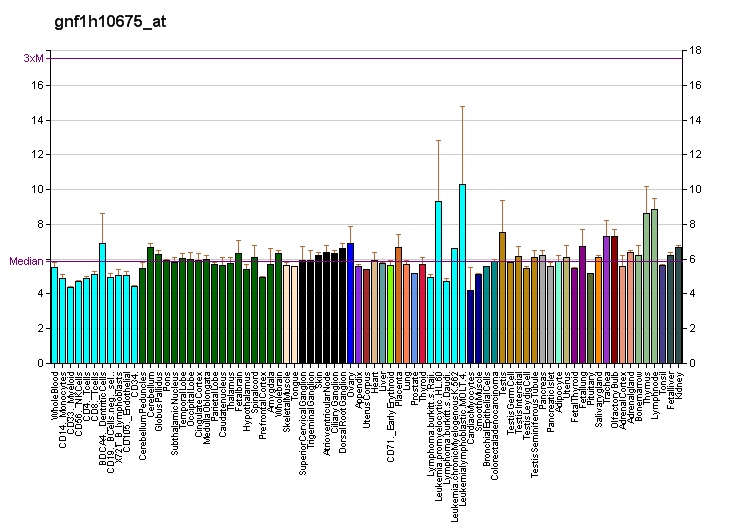
RNA expression pattern
Bgee	Human / Mouse (ortholog); Top expressed in: testicle; ganglionic eminence; endometrium; liver; urinary system; renal cortex; myometrium; temporal lobe; amygdala / n/a; More reference expression data
BioGPS	More reference expression data
Gene ontology
Molecular function	G protein-coupled receptor activity; olfactory receptor activity; transmembrane signaling receptor activity; signal transducer activity
Cellular component	integral component of membrane; plasma membrane; membrane
Biological process	sensory perception of smell; detection of chemical stimulus involved in sensory perception of smell; detection of chemical stimulus involved in sensory perception; signal transduction; response to stimulus; G protein-coupled receptor signaling pathway
Sources:Amigo / QuickGO
Orthologs
Databases	NCBI: entry; OMA: entry
Species	Human	Mouse
Entrez	138883	258944
Ensembl	ENSG00000171505	ENSMUSG00000075383
UniProt	Q8NGS0	Q8VGK1
RefSeq (mRNA)	NM_012363	NM_146942
RefSeq (protein)	NP_036495	NP_667153
Location (UCSC)	Chr 9: 122.53 – 122.53 Mb	Chr 2: 36.75 – 36.75 Mb
PubMed search
- Wikidata
View/Edit Human	View/Edit Mouse

Olfactory receptor 1N1 is a protein that in humans is encoded by the OR1N1 gene.

Olfactory receptors interact with odorant molecules in the nose, to initiate a neuronal response that triggers the perception of a smell. The olfactory receptor proteins are members of a large family of G-protein-coupled receptors (GPCR) arising from single coding-exon genes. Olfactory receptors share a 7-transmembrane domain structure with many neurotransmitter and hormone receptors and are responsible for the recognition and G protein-mediated transduction of odorant signals. The olfactory receptor gene family is the largest in the genome. The nomenclature assigned to the olfactory receptor genes and proteins for this organism is independent of other organisms.

== See also ==
- Olfactory receptor
