= OR2Z1 =

Protein-coding gene in the species Homo sapiens

Identifiers
- Aliases: OR2Z1, OR19-4, OR2Z2, olfactory receptor family 2 subfamily Z member 1
- External IDs: MGI: 3030206; GeneCards: OR2Z1

Gene location (Human)
| Chr. | Chromosome 19 (human) |
| Band | 19p13.2 | Start | 8,721,634 bp |
| Band | 19p13.2 | End | 8,732,160 bp |

Gene location (Mouse)
| Chr. | Chromosome 8 (mouse) |
| Band | 8|8 B3.3 | Start | 72,795,062 bp |
| Band | 8|8 B3.3 | End | 72,814,474 bp |
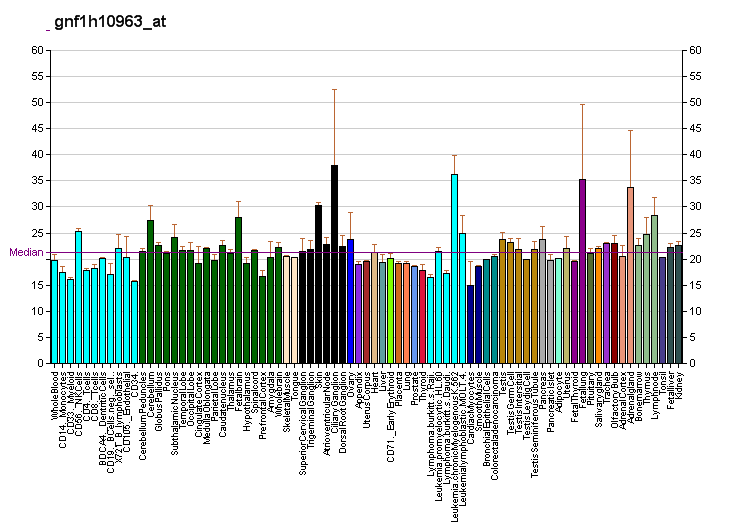
RNA expression pattern
| Bgee | Human / Mouse (ortholog); n/a / Top expressed in: granulocyte |
| BioGPS | More reference expression data |
Gene ontology
| Molecular function | G protein-coupled receptor activity; olfactory receptor activity; signal transducer activity |
| Cellular component | integral component of membrane; plasma membrane; membrane |
| Biological process | sensory perception of smell; signal transduction; response to stimulus; detection of chemical stimulus involved in sensory perception of smell; G protein-coupled receptor signaling pathway |
Sources:Amigo / QuickGO
Orthologs
| Databases | NCBI: entry; OMA: entry |
| Species | Human | Mouse |
| Entrez | 284383 | 404315 |
| Ensembl | ENSG00000181733 | ENSMUSG00000069998 |
| UniProt | Q8NG97 | Q7TRY2 |
| RefSeq (mRNA) | NM_001004699 | NM_207555 |
| RefSeq (protein) | NP_001004699 | NP_997438 |
| Location (UCSC) | Chr 19: 8.72 – 8.73 Mb | Chr 8: 72.8 – 72.81 Mb |
| PubMed search |
- Wikidata
| View/Edit Human | View/Edit Mouse |

Olfactory receptor 2Z1 is a protein that in humans is encoded by the OR2Z1 gene.

Olfactory receptors interact with odorant molecules in the nose, to initiate a neuronal response that triggers the perception of a smell. The olfactory receptor proteins are members of a large family of G-protein-coupled receptors (GPCR) arising from single coding-exon genes. Olfactory receptors share a 7-transmembrane domain structure with many neurotransmitter and hormone receptors and are responsible for the recognition and G protein-mediated transduction of odorant signals. The olfactory receptor gene family is the largest in the genome. The nomenclature assigned to the olfactory receptor genes and proteins for this organism is independent of other organisms.

== See also ==
- Olfactory receptor
