= OR1L8 =

Protein-coding gene in the species Homo sapiens

Identifiers
- Aliases: OR1L8, OR9-24, olfactory receptor family 1 subfamily L member 8
- External IDs: MGI: 3030189; GeneCards: OR1L8

Gene location (Human)
Chr.	Chromosome 9 (human)
Band	9q33.2	Start	122,567,117 bp
Band	9q33.2	End	122,583,384 bp

Gene location (Mouse)
Chr.	Chromosome 2 (mouse)
Band	2|2 B	Start	36,815,202 bp
Band	2|2 B	End	36,818,909 bp
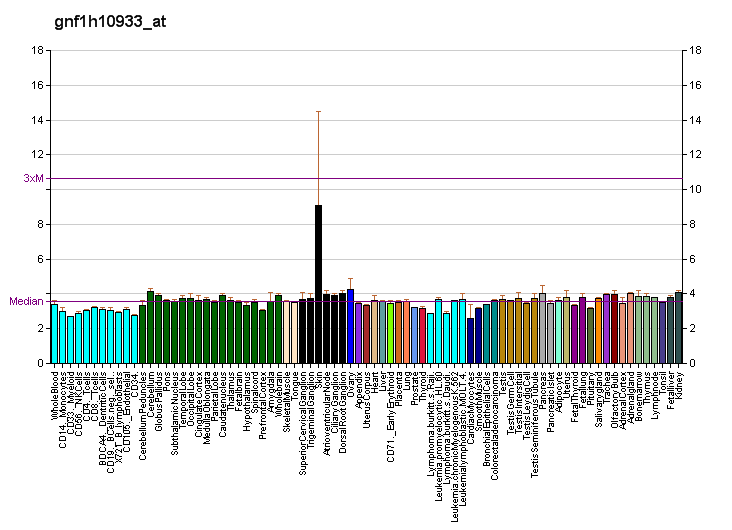
RNA expression pattern
Bgee	Human / Mouse (ortholog); Top expressed in: testicle; gastric mucosa; Achilles tendon; endometrium; tibial nerve; urinary bladder; right coronary artery; tibial arteries; subcutaneous adipose tissue; spleen / n/a; More reference expression data
BioGPS	More reference expression data
Gene ontology
Molecular function	G protein-coupled receptor activity; signal transducer activity; olfactory receptor activity
Cellular component	integral component of membrane; plasma membrane; membrane
Biological process	sensory perception of smell; detection of chemical stimulus involved in sensory perception of smell; signal transduction; response to stimulus; G protein-coupled receptor signaling pathway
Sources:Amigo / QuickGO
Orthologs
Databases	NCBI: entry; OMA: entry
Species	Human	Mouse
Entrez	138881	258618
Ensembl	ENSG00000171496	ENSMUSG00000075380
UniProt	Q8NGR8	Q8VFP6
RefSeq (mRNA)	NM_001004454	NM_146625
RefSeq (protein)	NP_001004454	NP_666836
Location (UCSC)	Chr 9: 122.57 – 122.58 Mb	Chr 2: 36.82 – 36.82 Mb
PubMed search
- Wikidata
View/Edit Human	View/Edit Mouse

Olfactory receptor 1L8 is a protein that in humans is encoded by the OR1L8 gene.

Olfactory receptors interact with odorant molecules in the nose, to initiate a neuronal response that triggers the perception of a smell. The olfactory receptor proteins are members of a large family of G-protein-coupled receptors (GPCR) arising from single coding-exon genes. Olfactory receptors share a 7-transmembrane domain structure with many neurotransmitter and hormone receptors and are responsible for the recognition and G protein-mediated transduction of odorant signals. The olfactory receptor gene family is the largest in the genome. The nomenclature assigned to the olfactory receptor genes and proteins for this organism is independent of other organisms.

== See also ==
- Olfactory receptor
