= OR2T6 =

Protein-coding gene in humans

Identifiers
- Aliases: OR2T6, OR2T6P, OR2T9, OST703, olfactory receptor family 2 subfamily T member 6
- External IDs: MGI: 3030554; GeneCards: OR2T6

Gene location (Human)
Chr.	Chromosome 1 (human)
Band	1q44	Start	248,375,746 bp
Band	1q44	End	248,391,811 bp

Gene location (Mouse)
Chr.	Chromosome 14 (mouse)
Band	14|14 A1	Start	8,282,925 bp
Band	14|14 A1	End	8,298,025 bp
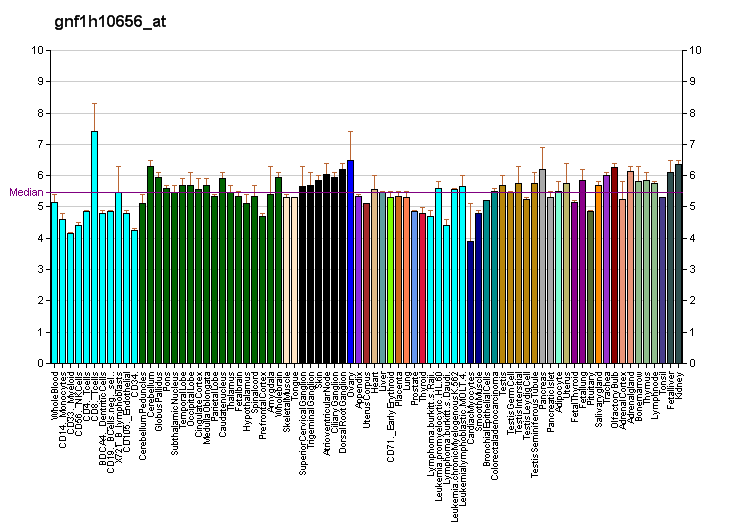
RNA expression pattern
Bgee	Human / Mouse (ortholog); Top expressed in: gonad; anterior cingulate cortex; human kidney / Top expressed in: respiratory epithelium; nasal epithelium; olfactory epithelium; More reference expression data
BioGPS	More reference expression data
Gene ontology
Molecular function	G protein-coupled receptor activity; olfactory receptor activity; signal transducer activity
Cellular component	integral component of membrane; plasma membrane; membrane
Biological process	sensory perception of smell; signal transduction; response to stimulus; detection of chemical stimulus involved in sensory perception of smell; G protein-coupled receptor signaling pathway
Sources:Amigo / QuickGO
Orthologs
Databases	NCBI: entry; OMA: entry
Species	Human	Mouse
Entrez	254879	258387
Ensembl	ENSG00000198104; ENSG00000278689; ENSG00000278659	ENSMUSG00000052417
UniProt	Q8NHC8	Q8VF37
RefSeq (mRNA)	NM_001005471	NM_146392
RefSeq (protein)	NP_001005471	NP_666504
Location (UCSC)	Chr 1: 248.38 – 248.39 Mb	Chr 14: 8.28 – 8.3 Mb
PubMed search
- Wikidata
View/Edit Human	View/Edit Mouse

Olfactory receptor 2T6 is a protein that in humans is encoded by the OR2T6 gene.

Olfactory receptors interact with odorant molecules in the nose, to initiate a neuronal response that triggers the perception of a smell. The olfactory receptor proteins are members of a large family of G-protein-coupled receptors (GPCR) arising from single coding-exon genes. Olfactory receptors share a 7-transmembrane domain structure with many neurotransmitter and hormone receptors and are responsible for the recognition and G protein-mediated transduction of odorant signals. The olfactory receptor gene family is the largest in the genome. The nomenclature assigned to the olfactory receptor genes and proteins for this organism is independent of other organisms.

== See also ==
- Olfactory receptor
