= OR1M1 =

Protein-coding gene in the species Homo sapiens

Identifiers
- Aliases: OR1M1, OR19-5, OR19-6, olfactory receptor family 1 subfamily M member 1
- External IDs: MGI: 109311; GeneCards: OR1M1

Gene location (Human)
Chr.	Chromosome 19 (human)
Band	19p13.2	Start	9,087,061 bp
Band	19p13.2	End	9,095,669 bp

Gene location (Mouse)
Chr.	Chromosome 9 (mouse)
Band	9|9 A2	Start	18,662,803 bp
Band	9|9 A2	End	18,675,292 bp
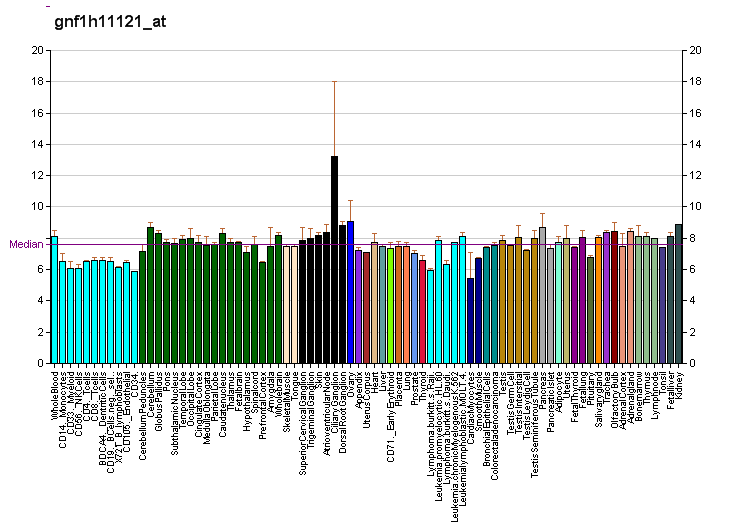
RNA expression pattern
Bgee	Human / Mouse (ortholog); Top expressed in: olfactory zone of nasal mucosa; right uterine tube; apex of heart / Top expressed in: respiratory epithelium; nasal epithelium; olfactory epithelium; More reference expression data
BioGPS	More reference expression data
Gene ontology
Molecular function	G protein-coupled receptor activity; olfactory receptor activity; signal transducer activity
Cellular component	integral component of membrane; plasma membrane; membrane
Biological process	sensory perception of smell; signal transduction; response to stimulus; detection of chemical stimulus involved in sensory perception of smell; G protein-coupled receptor signaling pathway
Sources:Amigo / QuickGO
Orthologs
Databases	NCBI: entry; OMA: entry
Species	Human	Mouse
Entrez	125963	18322
Ensembl	ENSG00000170929	ENSMUSG00000054141
UniProt	Q8NGA1	Q8VFM9
RefSeq (mRNA)	NM_001004456	NM_146606
RefSeq (protein)	NP_001004456	NP_666817
Location (UCSC)	Chr 19: 9.09 – 9.1 Mb	Chr 9: 18.66 – 18.68 Mb
PubMed search
- Wikidata
View/Edit Human	View/Edit Mouse

Olfactory receptor 1M1 is a protein that in humans is encoded by the OR1M1 gene.

Olfactory receptors interact with odorant molecules in the nose, to initiate a neuronal response that triggers the perception of a smell. The olfactory receptor proteins are members of a large family of G-protein-coupled receptors (GPCR) arising from single coding-exon genes. Olfactory receptors share a 7-transmembrane domain structure with many neurotransmitter and hormone receptors and are responsible for the recognition and G protein-mediated transduction of odorant signals. The olfactory receptor gene family is the largest in the genome. The nomenclature assigned to the olfactory receptor genes and proteins for this organism is independent of other organisms.

== See also ==
- Olfactory receptor
