= OR4D9 =

Protein-coding gene in the species Homo sapiens

Identifiers
- Aliases: OR4D9, OR11-253, olfactory receptor family 4 subfamily D member 9
- External IDs: MGI: 3031259; GeneCards: OR4D9

Gene location (Human)
Chr.	Chromosome 11 (human)
Band	11q12.1	Start	59,511,368 bp
Band	11q12.1	End	59,520,703 bp

Gene location (Mouse)
Chr.	Chromosome 19 (mouse)
Band	19|19 A	Start	12,050,598 bp
Band	19|19 A	End	12,055,095 bp
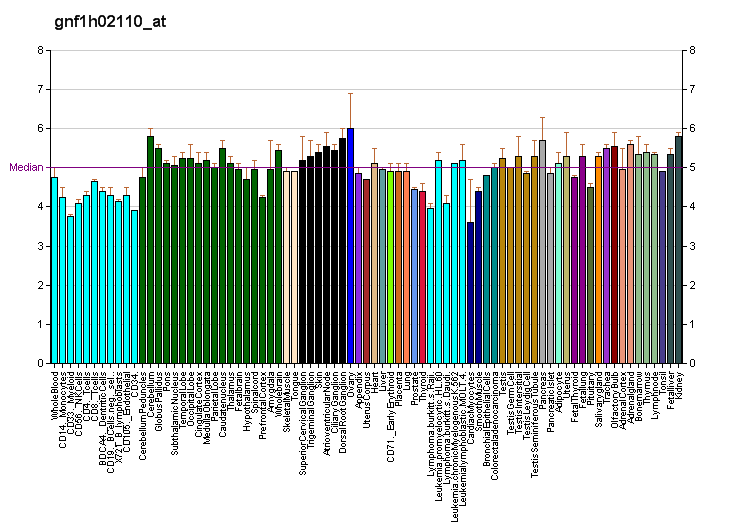
RNA expression pattern
Bgee	Human / Mouse (ortholog); Top expressed in: kidney; multicellular organism / Top expressed in: haematopoietic system; thymus; More reference expression data
BioGPS	More reference expression data
Gene ontology
Molecular function	G protein-coupled receptor activity; signal transducer activity; olfactory receptor activity; transmembrane signaling receptor activity
Cellular component	integral component of membrane; plasma membrane; membrane
Biological process	response to stimulus; detection of chemical stimulus involved in sensory perception; signal transduction; sensory perception of smell; detection of chemical stimulus involved in sensory perception of smell; G protein-coupled receptor signaling pathway
Sources:Amigo / QuickGO
Orthologs
Databases	NCBI: entry; OMA: entry
Species	Human	Mouse
Entrez	390199	258155
Ensembl	ENSG00000172742	ENSMUSG00000067526
UniProt	Q8NGE8	n/a
RefSeq (mRNA)	NM_001004711	NM_001011853
RefSeq (protein)	NP_001004711	n/a
Location (UCSC)	Chr 11: 59.51 – 59.52 Mb	Chr 19: 12.05 – 12.06 Mb
PubMed search
- Wikidata
View/Edit Human	View/Edit Mouse

Olfactory receptor 4D9 is a protein that in humans is encoded by the OR4D9 gene.

Olfactory receptors interact with odorant molecules in the nose, to initiate a neuronal response that triggers the perception of a smell. The olfactory receptor proteins are members of a large family of G-protein-coupled receptors (GPCR) arising from single coding-exon genes. Olfactory receptors share a 7-transmembrane domain structure with many neurotransmitter and hormone receptors and are responsible for the recognition and G protein-mediated transduction of odorant signals. The olfactory receptor gene family is the largest in the genome. The nomenclature assigned to the olfactory receptor genes and proteins for this organism is independent of other organisms.

== See also ==
- Olfactory receptor
