= OR4D5 =

Protein-coding gene in the species Homo sapiens

Identifiers
- Aliases: OR4D5, OR11-276, olfactory receptor family 4 subfamily D member 5
- External IDs: MGI: 3030818; GeneCards: OR4D5

Gene location (Human)
Chr.	Chromosome 11 (human)
Band	11q24.1	Start	123,939,617 bp
Band	11q24.1	End	123,940,573 bp

Gene location (Mouse)
Chr.	Chromosome 9 (mouse)
Band	9|9 A5.1	Start	40,007,811 bp
Band	9|9 A5.1	End	40,025,502 bp
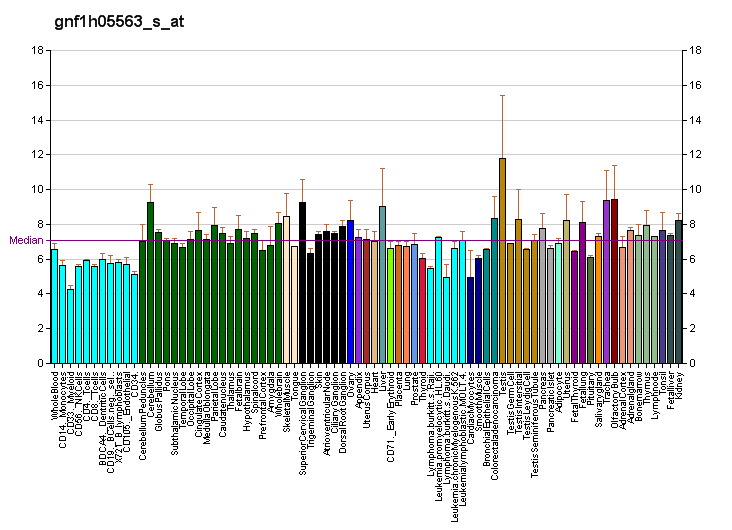
RNA expression pattern
Bgee	Human / Mouse (ortholog); Top expressed in: body of pancreas; rectum / n/a; More reference expression data
BioGPS	More reference expression data
Gene ontology
Molecular function	G protein-coupled receptor activity; olfactory receptor activity; transmembrane signaling receptor activity; signal transducer activity
Cellular component	integral component of membrane; plasma membrane; membrane
Biological process	sensory perception of smell; detection of chemical stimulus involved in sensory perception of smell; detection of chemical stimulus involved in sensory perception; signal transduction; response to stimulus; G protein-coupled receptor signaling pathway
Sources:Amigo / QuickGO
Orthologs
Databases	NCBI: entry; OMA: entry
Species	Human	Mouse
Entrez	219875	258601
Ensembl	ENSG00000171014	ENSMUSG00000045812
UniProt	Q8NGN0	Q8VFN1
RefSeq (mRNA)	NM_001001965	NM_146608
RefSeq (protein)	NP_001001965	NP_666819
Location (UCSC)	Chr 11: 123.94 – 123.94 Mb	Chr 9: 40.01 – 40.03 Mb
PubMed search
- Wikidata
View/Edit Human	View/Edit Mouse

Olfactory receptor 4D5 is a protein that in humans is encoded by the OR4D5 gene.

Olfactory receptors interact with odorant molecules in the nose, to initiate a neuronal response that triggers the perception of a smell. The olfactory receptor proteins are members of a large family of G-protein-coupled receptors (GPCR) arising from single coding-exon genes. Olfactory receptors share a 7-transmembrane domain structure with many neurotransmitter and hormone receptors and are responsible for the recognition and G protein-mediated transduction of odorant signals. The olfactory receptor gene family is the largest in the genome. The nomenclature assigned to the olfactory receptor genes and proteins for this organism is independent of other organisms.

== See also ==
- Olfactory receptor
