= OR1L4 =

Protein-coding gene in the species Homo sapiens

Identifiers
- Aliases: OR1L4, OR1L5, OR9-29, OR9-E, OST046, olfactory receptor family 1 subfamily L member 4
- External IDs: MGI: 3030199; GeneCards: OR1L4

Gene location (Human)
Chr.	Chromosome 9 (human)
Band	9q33.2	Start	122,723,990 bp
Band	9q33.2	End	122,724,925 bp

Gene location (Mouse)
Chr.	Chromosome 2 (mouse)
Band	2|2 B	Start	37,078,210 bp
Band	2|2 B	End	37,096,031 bp
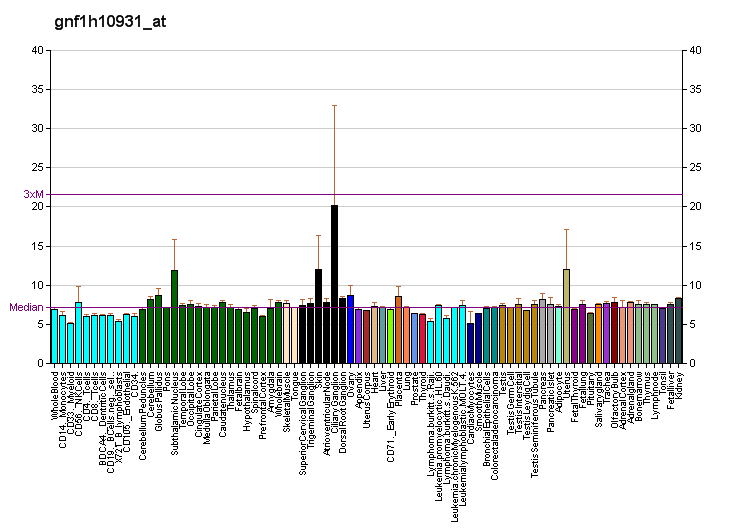
RNA expression pattern
Bgee	Human / Mouse (ortholog); Top expressed in: sural nerve; Achilles tendon; corpus callosum; right uterine tube / n/a; More reference expression data
BioGPS	More reference expression data
Gene ontology
Molecular function	G protein-coupled receptor activity; signal transducer activity; olfactory receptor activity
Cellular component	membrane; plasma membrane; integral component of membrane
Biological process	sensory perception of smell; detection of chemical stimulus involved in sensory perception of smell; signal transduction; response to stimulus; G protein-coupled receptor signaling pathway
Sources:Amigo / QuickGO
Orthologs
Databases	NCBI: entry; OMA: entry
Species	Human	Mouse
Entrez	254973	258656
Ensembl	ENSG00000136939	ENSMUSG00000059429
UniProt	Q8NGR5	Q8VFT2
RefSeq (mRNA)	NM_001005235	NM_146662
RefSeq (protein)	NP_001005235	NP_666873
Location (UCSC)	Chr 9: 122.72 – 122.72 Mb	Chr 2: 37.08 – 37.1 Mb
PubMed search
- Wikidata
View/Edit Human	View/Edit Mouse

Olfactory receptor 1L4 is a protein that in humans is encoded by the OR1L4 gene.

Olfactory receptors interact with odorant molecules in the nose, to initiate a neuronal response that triggers the perception of a smell. The olfactory receptor proteins are members of a large family of G-protein-coupled receptors (GPCR) arising from single coding-exon genes. Olfactory receptors share a 7-transmembrane domain structure with many neurotransmitter and hormone receptors and are responsible for the recognition and G protein-mediated transduction of odorant signals. The olfactory receptor gene family is the largest in the genome. The nomenclature assigned to the olfactory receptor genes and proteins for this organism is independent of other organisms.

== See also ==
- Olfactory receptor
