= OR1J1 =

Protein-coding gene in the species Homo sapiens

Identifiers
- Aliases: OR1J1, OR9-18, hg32, olfactory receptor family 1 subfamily J member 1
- External IDs: MGI: 102697; GeneCards: OR1J1

Gene location (Human)
Chr.	Chromosome 9 (human)
Band	9q33.2	Start	122,476,958 bp
Band	9q33.2	End	122,477,926 bp

Gene location (Mouse)
Chr.	Chromosome 2 (mouse)
Band	2|2 B	Start	36,701,504 bp
Band	2|2 B	End	36,707,044 bp
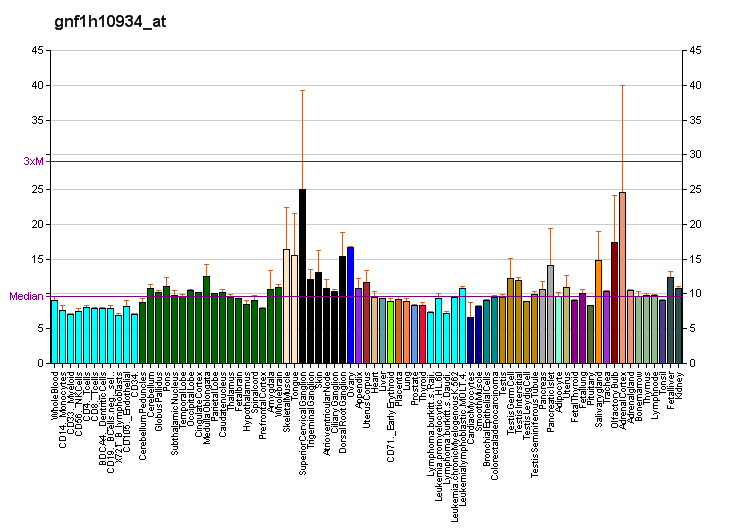
RNA expression pattern
Bgee	Human / Mouse (ortholog); Top expressed in: testicle; endometrium; gastric mucosa; right lung; gallbladder; ectocervix; upper lobe of left lung / n/a; More reference expression data
BioGPS	More reference expression data
Gene ontology
Molecular function	G protein-coupled receptor activity; olfactory receptor activity; signal transducer activity
Cellular component	integral component of membrane; plasma membrane; membrane
Biological process	sensory perception of smell; signal transduction; response to stimulus; detection of chemical stimulus involved in sensory perception of smell; G protein-coupled receptor signaling pathway
Sources:Amigo / QuickGO
Orthologs
Databases	NCBI: entry; OMA: entry
Species	Human	Mouse
Entrez	347168	18328
Ensembl	ENSG00000136834	ENSMUSG00000075384
UniProt	Q8NGS3	Q60879
RefSeq (mRNA)	NM_001004451	NM_206903
RefSeq (protein)	NP_001004451	NP_996786
Location (UCSC)	Chr 9: 122.48 – 122.48 Mb	Chr 2: 36.7 – 36.71 Mb
PubMed search
- Wikidata
View/Edit Human	View/Edit Mouse

Olfactory receptor 1J1 is a protein that in humans is encoded by the OR1J1 gene.

Olfactory receptors interact with odorant molecules in the nose, to initiate a neuronal response that triggers the perception of a smell. The olfactory receptor proteins are members of a large family of G-protein-coupled receptors (GPCR) arising from single coding-exon genes. Olfactory receptors share a 7-transmembrane domain structure with many neurotransmitter and hormone receptors and are responsible for the recognition and G protein-mediated transduction of odorant signals. The olfactory receptor gene family is the largest in the genome. The nomenclature assigned to the olfactory receptor genes and proteins for this organism is independent of other organisms.

== See also ==
- Olfactory receptor
