= OR4B1 =

Protein-coding gene in the species Homo sapiens

Identifiers
- Aliases: OR4B1, OR11-106, OST208, olfactory receptor family 4 subfamily B member 1
- External IDs: MGI: 109303; GeneCards: OR4B1

Gene location (Human)
Chr.	Chromosome 11 (human)
Band	11p11.2	Start	48,216,810 bp
Band	11p11.2	End	48,217,739 bp

Gene location (Mouse)
Chr.	Chromosome 2 (mouse)
Band	2|2 E1	Start	89,966,617 bp
Band	2|2 E1	End	89,972,640 bp
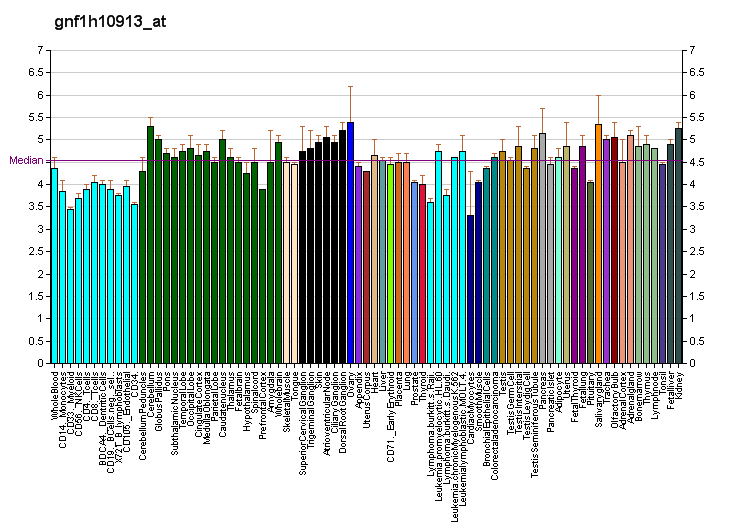
RNA expression pattern
Bgee	Human / Mouse (ortholog); n/a / Top expressed in: embryo; olfactory bulb
BioGPS	More reference expression data
Gene ontology
Molecular function	G protein-coupled receptor activity; olfactory receptor activity; transmembrane signaling receptor activity; signal transducer activity
Cellular component	integral component of membrane; plasma membrane; membrane
Biological process	sensory perception of smell; detection of chemical stimulus involved in sensory perception of smell; detection of chemical stimulus involved in sensory perception; signal transduction; response to stimulus; G protein-coupled receptor signaling pathway
Sources:Amigo / QuickGO
Orthologs
Databases	NCBI: entry; OMA: entry
Species	Human	Mouse
Entrez	119765	18331
Ensembl	ENSG00000175619	ENSMUSG00000075066
UniProt	Q8NGF8	n/a
RefSeq (mRNA)	NM_001005470	NM_010980
RefSeq (protein)	NP_001005470	n/a
Location (UCSC)	Chr 11: 48.22 – 48.22 Mb	Chr 2: 89.97 – 89.97 Mb
PubMed search
- Wikidata
View/Edit Human	View/Edit Mouse

Olfactory receptor 4B1 is a protein that in humans is encoded by the OR4B1 gene.

Olfactory receptors interact with odorant molecules in the nose, to initiate a neuronal response that triggers the perception of a smell. The olfactory receptor proteins are members of a large family of G-protein-coupled receptors (GPCR) arising from single coding-exon genes. Olfactory receptors share a 7-transmembrane domain structure with many neurotransmitter and hormone receptors and are responsible for the recognition and G protein-mediated transduction of odorant signals. The olfactory receptor gene family is the largest in the genome. The nomenclature assigned to the olfactory receptor genes and proteins for this organism is independent of other organisms.

== See also ==
- Olfactory receptor
