= OR1F1 =

Protein-coding gene in the species Homo sapiens

Identifiers
- Aliases: OR1F1, OLFMF, OR16-36, OR16-37, OR16-88, OR16-89, OR16-90, OR1F10, OR1F13P, OR1F4, OR1F5, OR1F6, OR1F7, OR1F8, OR1F9, OR3-145, ORL1023, olfactory receptor family 1 subfamily F member 1
- External IDs: OMIM: 603232; MGI: 3032605; GeneCards: OR1F1

Gene location (Mouse)
Chr.	Chromosome 16 (mouse)
Band	16|16 A1	Start	3,408,906 bp
Band	16|16 A1	End	3,417,187 bp
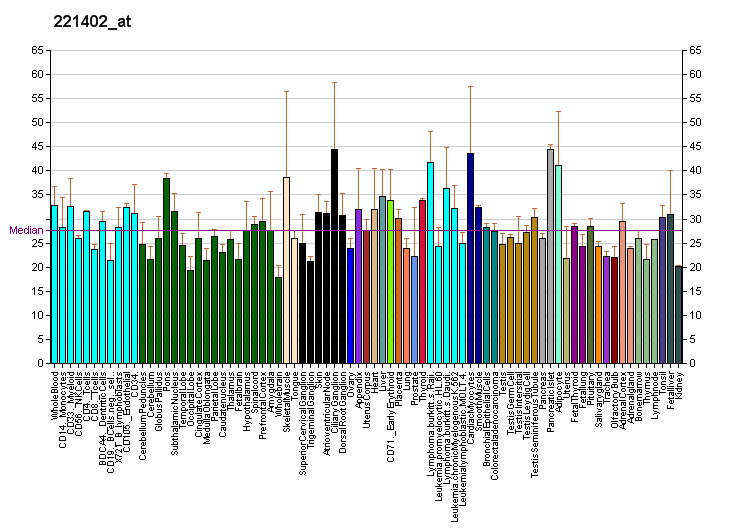
RNA expression pattern
Bgee	Human / Mouse (ortholog); n/a / Top expressed in: morula; testicle
BioGPS	More reference expression data
Gene ontology
Molecular function	G protein-coupled receptor activity; olfactory receptor activity; signal transducer activity
Cellular component	integral component of membrane; plasma membrane; membrane
Biological process	sensory perception of smell; signal transduction; response to stimulus; detection of chemical stimulus involved in sensory perception of smell; G protein-coupled receptor signaling pathway
Sources:Amigo / QuickGO
Orthologs
Databases	NCBI: entry; OMA: entry
Species	Human	Mouse
Entrez	4992	258859
Ensembl	ENSG00000168124	ENSMUSG00000051003
UniProt	O43749	Q8VGB9
RefSeq (mRNA)	NM_012360	NM_146860
RefSeq (protein)	NP_036492; NP_001357568; NP_001357569; NP_001357570	NP_667071
Location (UCSC)	n/a	Chr 16: 3.41 – 3.42 Mb
PubMed search
- Wikidata
View/Edit Human	View/Edit Mouse

Olfactory receptor 1F1 is a protein that in humans is encoded by the OR1F1 gene.

Olfactory receptors interact with odorant molecules in the nose, to initiate a neuronal response that triggers the perception of a smell. The olfactory receptor proteins are members of a large family of G-protein-coupled receptors (GPCR) arising from single coding-exon genes. Olfactory receptors share a 7-transmembrane domain structure with many neurotransmitter and hormone receptors and are responsible for the recognition and G protein-mediated transduction of odorant signals. The olfactory receptor gene family is the largest in the genome. The nomenclature assigned to the olfactory receptor genes and proteins for this organism is independent of other organisms.

== See also ==
- Olfactory receptor
