= OR4S2 =

Protein-coding gene in the species Homo sapiens

Identifiers
- Aliases: OR4S2, OR11-137, OR4S2P, OST725, olfactory receptor family 4 subfamily S member 2
- External IDs: MGI: 3031027; GeneCards: OR4S2

Gene location (Human)
Chr.	Chromosome 11 (human)
Band	11q11	Start	55,648,327 bp
Band	11q11	End	55,652,854 bp

Gene location (Mouse)
Chr.	Chromosome 2 (mouse)
Band	2|2 D	Start	88,505,972 bp
Band	2|2 D	End	88,511,487 bp
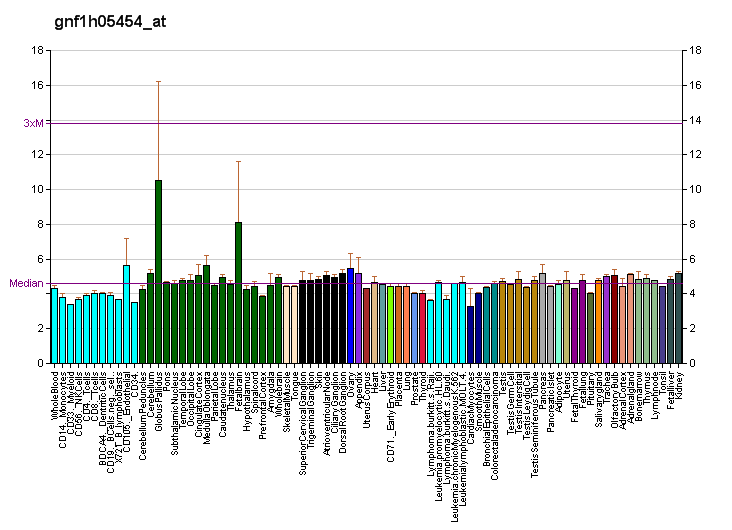
RNA expression pattern
Bgee	Human / Mouse (ortholog); n/a / n/a
BioGPS	More reference expression data
Gene ontology
Molecular function	G protein-coupled receptor activity; olfactory receptor activity; transmembrane signaling receptor activity; signal transducer activity
Cellular component	integral component of membrane; plasma membrane; membrane
Biological process	sensory perception of smell; detection of chemical stimulus involved in sensory perception of smell; detection of chemical stimulus involved in sensory perception; signal transduction; response to stimulus; G protein-coupled receptor signaling pathway
Sources:Amigo / QuickGO
Orthologs
Databases	NCBI: entry; OMA: entry
Species	Human	Mouse
Entrez	219431	329460
Ensembl	ENSG00000174982	ENSMUSG00000060827
UniProt	Q8NH73	n/a
RefSeq (mRNA)	NM_001004059	NM_001011517
RefSeq (protein)	NP_001004059	n/a
Location (UCSC)	Chr 11: 55.65 – 55.65 Mb	Chr 2: 88.51 – 88.51 Mb
PubMed search
- Wikidata
View/Edit Human	View/Edit Mouse

Olfactory receptor 4S2 is a protein that in humans is encoded by the OR4S2 gene.

Olfactory receptors interact with odorant molecules in the nose, to initiate a neuronal response that triggers the perception of a smell. The olfactory receptor proteins are members of a large family of G-protein-coupled receptors (GPCR) arising from single coding-exon genes. Olfactory receptors share a 7-transmembrane domain structure with many neurotransmitter and hormone receptors and are responsible for the recognition and G protein-mediated transduction of odorant signals. The olfactory receptor gene family is the largest in the genome. The nomenclature assigned to the olfactory receptor genes and proteins for this organism is independent of other organisms.

== See also ==
- Olfactory receptor
