= OR2T10 =

Protein-coding gene in humans

Identifiers
- Aliases: OR2T10, OR1-64, olfactory receptor family 2 subfamily T member 10
- External IDs: GeneCards: OR2T10

Gene location (Human)
| Chr. | Chromosome 1 (human) |
| Band | 1q44 | Start | 248,590,487 bp |
| Band | 1q44 | End | 248,597,700 bp |
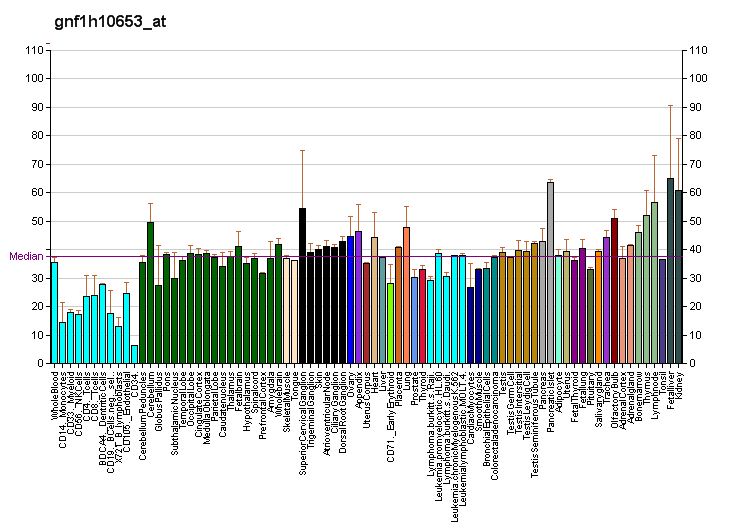
RNA expression pattern
| Bgee | Human / Mouse (ortholog); Top expressed in: lymph node; placenta; skin of abdomen; rectum; prostate; human kidney / n/a; More reference expression data |
| BioGPS | More reference expression data |
Gene ontology
| Molecular function | G protein-coupled receptor activity; olfactory receptor activity; signal transducer activity |
| Cellular component | integral component of membrane; plasma membrane; membrane |
| Biological process | sensory perception of smell; signal transduction; response to stimulus; detection of chemical stimulus involved in sensory perception of smell; G protein-coupled receptor signaling pathway |
Sources:Amigo / QuickGO
Orthologs
| Databases | NCBI: entry; OMA: entry |
| Species | Human | Mouse |
| Entrez | 127069 | n/a |
| Ensembl | ENSG00000184022 | n/a |
| UniProt | Q8NGZ9 | n/a |
| RefSeq (mRNA) | NM_001004693 | n/a |
| RefSeq (protein) | NP_001004693 | n/a |
| Location (UCSC) | Chr 1: 248.59 – 248.6 Mb | n/a |
| PubMed search | | n/a |
- Wikidata
| View/Edit Human |

Olfactory receptor 2T10 is a protein that in humans is encoded by the OR2T10 gene.

Olfactory receptors interact with odorant molecules in the nose, to initiate a neuronal response that triggers the perception of a smell. The olfactory receptor proteins are members of a large family of G-protein-coupled receptors (GPCR) arising from single coding-exon genes. Olfactory receptors share a 7-transmembrane domain structure with many neurotransmitter and hormone receptors and are responsible for the recognition and G protein-mediated transduction of odorant signals. The olfactory receptor gene family is the largest in the genome. The nomenclature assigned to the olfactory receptor genes and proteins for this organism is independent of other organisms.

== See also ==
- Olfactory receptor
