= OR4X1 =

Protein-coding gene in the species Homo sapiens

Identifiers
- Aliases: OR4X1, OR11-104, olfactory receptor family 4 subfamily X member 1 (gene/pseudogene), olfactory receptor family 4 subfamily X member 1
- External IDs: GeneCards: OR4X1

Gene location (Human)
Chr.	Chromosome 11 (human)
Band	11p11.2	Start	48,263,861 bp
Band	11p11.2	End	48,264,778 bp
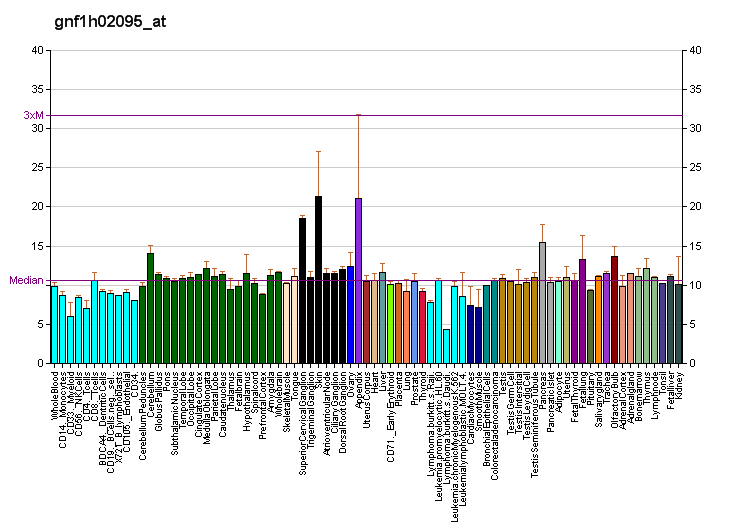
RNA expression pattern
Bgee	Human / Mouse (ortholog); n/a / n/a
BioGPS	More reference expression data
Gene ontology
Molecular function	G protein-coupled receptor activity; olfactory receptor activity; transmembrane signaling receptor activity; signal transducer activity
Cellular component	integral component of membrane; plasma membrane; membrane
Biological process	sensory perception of smell; detection of chemical stimulus involved in sensory perception of smell; detection of chemical stimulus involved in sensory perception; signal transduction; response to stimulus; G protein-coupled receptor signaling pathway
Sources:Amigo / QuickGO
Orthologs
Databases	NCBI: entry; OMA: entry
Species	Human	Mouse
Entrez	390113	n/a
Ensembl	ENSG00000176567	n/a
UniProt	Q8NH49	n/a
RefSeq (mRNA)	NM_001004726	n/a
RefSeq (protein)	NP_001004726	n/a
Location (UCSC)	Chr 11: 48.26 – 48.26 Mb	n/a
PubMed search		n/a
- Wikidata
View/Edit Human

Olfactory receptor 4X1 is a protein that in humans is encoded by the OR4X1 gene.

Olfactory receptors interact with odorant molecules in the nose, to initiate a neuronal response that triggers the perception of a smell. The olfactory receptor proteins are members of a large family of G-protein-coupled receptors (GPCR) arising from single-coding exons. Olfactory receptors share a 7-transmembrane domain structure with many neurotransmitter and hormone receptors and are responsible for the recognition and G protein-mediated transduction of odorant signals. The olfactory receptor gene family is the largest in the genome. The nomenclature assigned to the olfactory receptor genes and proteins for this organism is independent of other organisms.

== See also ==
- Olfactory receptor
