= MSANTD4 =

Protein-coding gene in the species Homo sapiens

Identifiers
- Aliases: MSANTD4, KIAA1826, Myb/SANT DNA binding domain containing 4 with coiled-coils
- External IDs: MGI: 1925350; GeneCards: MSANTD4

Gene location (Human)
Chr.	Chromosome 11 (human)
Band	11q22.3	Start	105,995,623 bp
Band	11q22.3	End	106,022,403 bp

Gene location (Mouse)
Chr.	Chromosome 9 (mouse)
Band	9|9 A1	Start	4,376,562 bp
Band	9|9 A1	End	4,386,870 bp
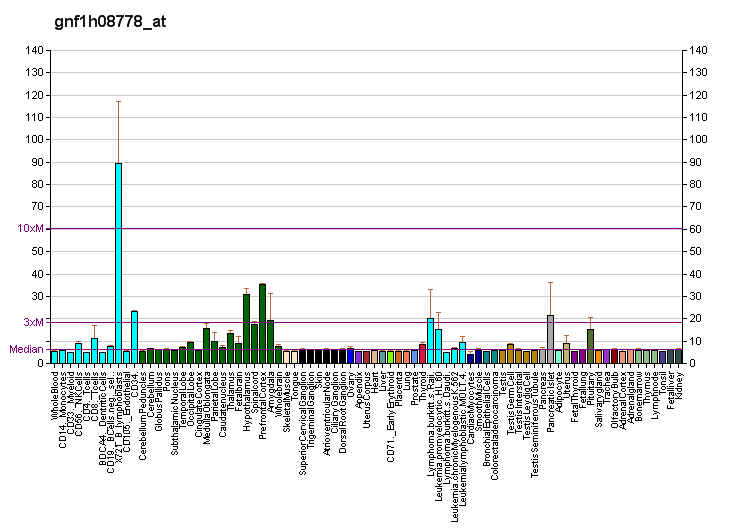
RNA expression pattern
Bgee	Human / Mouse (ortholog); Top expressed in: tendon of biceps brachii; internal globus pallidus; Achilles tendon; endothelial cell; ganglionic eminence; tibialis anterior muscle; right ventricle; corpus callosum; retinal pigment epithelium; tail of epididymis / Top expressed in: substantia nigra; medial ganglionic eminence; supraoptic nucleus; right ventricle; habenula; suprachiasmatic nucleus; primitive streak; vestibular membrane of cochlear duct; Region I of hippocampus proper; carotid body; More reference expression data
BioGPS	More reference expression data
Orthologs
Databases	NCBI: entry; OMA: entry
Species	Human	Mouse
Entrez	84437	78100
Ensembl	ENSG00000170903	ENSMUSG00000041124
UniProt	Q8NCY6	Q91YU3
RefSeq (mRNA)	NM_032424; NM_001318747; NM_001318748; NM_001318749; NM_001318750	NM_145609
RefSeq (protein)	NP_001305676; NP_001305677; NP_001305678; NP_001305679; NP_115800	NP_663584
Location (UCSC)	Chr 11: 106 – 106.02 Mb	Chr 9: 4.38 – 4.39 Mb
PubMed search
- Wikidata
View/Edit Human	View/Edit Mouse

Myb/SANT-like DNA-binding domain-containing protein 4 is a protein that in humans is encoded by the MSANTD4 gene (previously KIAA1826). Not much has been reported about the function of this gene, but it is reported to be located in the cell nucleus.
