= NDFIP1 =

Protein-coding gene in the species Homo sapiens

Identifiers
- Aliases: NDFIP1, N4WBP5, Nedd4 family interacting protein 1
- External IDs: OMIM: 612050; MGI: 1929601; HomoloGene: 12730; GeneCards: NDFIP1; OMA:NDFIP1 - orthologs

Gene location (Human)
Chr.	Chromosome 5 (human)
Band	5q31.3	Start	142,108,779 bp
Band	5q31.3	End	142,154,440 bp

Gene location (Mouse)
Chr.	Chromosome 18 (mouse)
Band	18|18 B3	Start	38,543,449 bp
Band	18|18 B3	End	38,598,356 bp
RNA expression pattern
Bgee	Human / Mouse (ortholog); Top expressed in: Brodmann area 23; endothelial cell; pons; middle temporal gyrus; superior frontal gyrus; entorhinal cortex; postcentral gyrus; lateral nuclear group of thalamus; spinal ganglia; primary visual cortex / Top expressed in: cingulate gyrus; Epithelium of choroid plexus; medial dorsal nucleus; mammillary body; ventral tegmental area; dorsomedial hypothalamic nucleus; ventromedial nucleus; median eminence; seminal vesicula; paraventricular nucleus of hypothalamus; More reference expression data
BioGPS	n/a
Gene ontology
Molecular function	signal transducer activity; protein binding; WW domain binding
Cellular component	integral component of membrane; endosome; membrane; Golgi membrane; extracellular region; cell cortex; perinuclear region of cytoplasm; endosome membrane; cell junction; dendrite; cell projection; neuron projection; synapse; Golgi apparatus
Biological process	regulation of myeloid leukocyte differentiation; regulation of isotype switching to IgG isotypes; positive regulation of protein catabolic process; negative regulation of interleukin-4 production; metal ion transport; negative regulation of isotype switching to IgE isotypes; negative regulation of gene expression; negative regulation of T cell proliferation; regulation of lymphocyte differentiation; negative regulation of protein transport; negative regulation of type 2 immune response; positive regulation of I-kappaB kinase/NF-kappaB signaling; positive regulation of protein ubiquitination; negative regulation of inflammatory response; negative regulation of transporter activity; vacuolar transport; cellular iron ion homeostasis; signal transduction
Sources:Amigo / QuickGO
Orthologs
Species	Human	Mouse
Entrez	80762	65113
Ensembl	ENSG00000131507	ENSMUSG00000024425
UniProt	Q9BT67	Q8R0W6
RefSeq (mRNA)	NM_030571	NM_022996; NM_001355749
RefSeq (protein)	NP_085048	NP_075372; NP_001342678
Location (UCSC)	Chr 5: 142.11 – 142.15 Mb	Chr 18: 38.54 – 38.6 Mb
PubMed search
- Wikidata
View/Edit Human	View/Edit Mouse

Nedd4 family interacting protein 1 is a protein that in humans is encoded by the NDFIP1 gene.

== Function ==
The protein encoded by this gene belongs to a small group of evolutionarily conserved proteins with three transmembrane domains. It is a potential target for ubiquitination by the Nedd4 family of proteins. This protein is thought to be part of a family of integral Golgi membrane proteins. [provided by RefSeq, Jul 2008].
