= OR2L13 =

Protein-coding gene in humans

Identifiers
- Aliases: OR2L13, OR2L14, olfactory receptor family 2 subfamily L member 13
- External IDs: MGI: 3030000; GeneCards: OR2L13

Gene location (Human)
Chr.	Chromosome 1 (human)
Band	1q44	Start	248,095,184 bp
Band	1q44	End	248,101,103 bp

Gene location (Mouse)
Chr.	Chromosome 16 (mouse)
Band	16|16 A3	Start	19,302,444 bp
Band	16|16 A3	End	19,308,632 bp
RNA expression pattern
Bgee	Human / Mouse (ortholog); Top expressed in: prefrontal cortex; C1 segment; Brodmann area 9; hypothalamus; endothelial cell; right frontal lobe; anterior cingulate cortex; substantia nigra; primary visual cortex; putamen / n/a; More reference expression data
BioGPS	n/a
Gene ontology
Molecular function	G protein-coupled receptor activity; protein binding; olfactory receptor activity; signal transducer activity
Cellular component	integral component of membrane; plasma membrane; membrane
Biological process	sensory perception of smell; signal transduction; response to stimulus; detection of chemical stimulus involved in sensory perception of smell; G protein-coupled receptor signaling pathway; biological process
Sources:Amigo / QuickGO
Orthologs
Databases	NCBI: entry; OMA: entry
Species	Human	Mouse
Entrez	284521	259071
Ensembl	ENSG00000196071	ENSMUSG00000056822
UniProt	Q8N349	Q8VGX2
RefSeq (mRNA)	NM_001304535; NM_175911; NM_001395936	NM_147068
RefSeq (protein)	NP_001291464; NP_787107	NP_667279
Location (UCSC)	Chr 1: 248.1 – 248.1 Mb	Chr 16: 19.3 – 19.31 Mb
PubMed search
- Wikidata
View/Edit Human	View/Edit Mouse

Olfactory receptor 2L13 is a protein that in humans is encoded by the OR2L13 gene.

== Function ==
Olfactory receptors interact with odorant molecules in the nose, to initiate a neuronal response that triggers the perception of a smell. The olfactory receptor proteins are members of a large family of G-protein-coupled receptors (GPCR) arising from single coding-exon genes. Olfactory receptors share a 7-transmembrane domain structure with many neurotransmitter and hormone receptors and are responsible for the recognition and G protein-mediated transduction of odorant signals. The olfactory receptor gene family is the largest in the genome. The nomenclature assigned to the olfactory receptor genes and proteins for this organism is independent of other organisms. OR2L13 was recently implicated in regulating platelet reactivity and growth of abdominal aortic aneurysms https://www.ahajournals.org/doi/10.1161/CIRCULATIONAHA.125.078927?url_ver=Z39.88-2003&rfr_id=ori:rid:crossref.org&rfr_dat=cr_pub%20%200pubmed

== See also ==
- Olfactory receptor
