= OR4E2 =

Protein-coding gene in the species Homo sapiens

Identifiers
- Aliases: OR4E2, OR14-42, olfactory receptor family 4 subfamily E member 2, olfactory receptor family 4 subfamily E member 2 (gene/pseudogene)
- External IDs: MGI: 3031343; GeneCards: OR4E2

Gene location (Human)
Chr.	Chromosome 14 (human)
Band	14q11.2	Start	21,653,835 bp
Band	14q11.2	End	21,667,642 bp

Gene location (Mouse)
Chr.	Chromosome 14 (mouse)
Band	14|14 C2	Start	52,680,447 bp
Band	14|14 C2	End	52,690,031 bp
RNA expression pattern
Bgee	Human / Mouse (ortholog); Top expressed in: muscle of thigh; renal cortex; blood; urinary bladder / Top expressed in: Jacobson's organ; spermatid; choroid plexus of fourth ventricle; gastrula; respiratory epithelium; nasal epithelium; olfactory epithelium; spermatocyte; More reference expression data
BioGPS	n/a
Gene ontology
Molecular function	G protein-coupled receptor activity; olfactory receptor activity; transmembrane signaling receptor activity; signal transducer activity; copper ion binding; odorant binding
Cellular component	membrane; plasma membrane; integral component of membrane; integral component of plasma membrane
Biological process	sensory perception of smell; detection of chemical stimulus involved in sensory perception of smell; detection of chemical stimulus involved in sensory perception; signal transduction; response to stimulus; G protein-coupled receptor signaling pathway
Sources:Amigo / QuickGO
Orthologs
Databases	NCBI: entry; OMA: entry
Species	Human	Mouse
Entrez	26686	57271
Ensembl	ENSG00000221977	ENSMUSG00000035626
UniProt	Q8NGC2	Q7TQQ0
RefSeq (mRNA)	NM_001001912	NM_020514
RefSeq (protein)	NP_001001912; NP_001001912	NP_065260
Location (UCSC)	Chr 14: 21.65 – 21.67 Mb	Chr 14: 52.68 – 52.69 Mb
PubMed search
- Wikidata
View/Edit Human	View/Edit Mouse

Olfactory receptor 4E2 is a protein that in humans is encoded by the OR4E2 gene.

Olfactory receptors interact with odorant molecules in the nose, to initiate a neuronal response that triggers the perception of a smell. The olfactory receptor proteins are members of a large family of G-protein-coupled receptors (GPCR) arising from single coding-exon genes. Olfactory receptors share a 7-transmembrane domain structure with many neurotransmitter and hormone receptors and are responsible for the recognition and G protein-mediated transduction of odorant signals. The olfactory receptor gene family is the largest in the genome. The nomenclature assigned to the olfactory receptor genes and proteins for this organism is independent of other organisms.

== See also ==
- Olfactory receptor
