= OR2A4 =

Protein-coding gene in the species Homo sapiens

Identifiers
- Aliases: OR2A4, OR2A10, olfactory receptor family 2 subfamily A member 4, OR2A7
- External IDs: MGI: 104812; GeneCards: OR2A4

Gene location (Human)
Chr.	Chromosome 6 (human)
Band	6q23.2	Start	131,699,644 bp
Band	6q23.2	End	131,701,401 bp

Gene location (Mouse)
Chr.	Chromosome 6 (mouse)
Band	6|6 B2.1	Start	43,149,074 bp
Band	6|6 B2.1	End	43,154,394 bp
RNA expression pattern
Bgee	Human / Mouse (ortholog); Top expressed in: epithelium of colon; mucosa of transverse colon; bone marrow cell; ventricular zone; right coronary artery; endometrium; ganglionic eminence; placenta; liver; muscle tissue / Top expressed in: testicle; spermatid; More reference expression data
BioGPS	n/a
Gene ontology
Molecular function	G protein-coupled receptor activity; olfactory receptor activity; transmembrane signaling receptor activity; signal transducer activity; molecular function
Cellular component	integral component of membrane; recycling endosome; mitotic spindle midzone; mitotic spindle pole; plasma membrane; cleavage furrow; membrane; Flemming body
Biological process	positive regulation of cytokinesis; sensory perception of smell; detection of chemical stimulus involved in sensory perception of smell; regulation of actin cytoskeleton organization; detection of chemical stimulus involved in sensory perception; signal transduction; response to stimulus; G protein-coupled receptor signaling pathway
Sources:Amigo / QuickGO
Orthologs
Databases	NCBI: entry; OMA: entry
Species	Human	Mouse
Entrez	79541	18310
Ensembl	ENSG00000180658	ENSMUSG00000043605
UniProt	O95047	P34984
RefSeq (mRNA)	NM_030908	NM_146652
RefSeq (protein)	NP_112170	NP_666863
Location (UCSC)	Chr 6: 131.7 – 131.7 Mb	Chr 6: 43.15 – 43.15 Mb
PubMed search
- Wikidata
View/Edit Human	View/Edit Mouse

Olfactory receptor 2A4 is a protein that in humans is encoded by the OR2A4 gene.

Olfactory receptors interact with odorant molecules in the nose, to initiate a neuronal response that triggers the perception of a smell. The olfactory receptor proteins are members of a large family of G-protein-coupled receptors (GPCR) arising from single coding-exon genes. Olfactory receptors share a 7-transmembrane domain structure with many neurotransmitter and hormone receptors and are responsible for the recognition and G protein-mediated transduction of odorant signals. The olfactory receptor gene family is the largest in the genome. The nomenclature assigned to the olfactory receptor genes and proteins for this organism is independent of other organisms.

== See also ==
- Olfactory receptor
