= NFAT activating protein with ITAM motif 1 =

NFAM1

Identifiers
- Aliases: NFAM1, CNAIP, bK126B4.4, NFAT activating protein with ITAM motif 1
- External IDs: OMIM: 608740; MGI: 1921289; GeneCards: NFAM1

Gene location (Human)
Chr.	Chromosome 22 (human)
Band	22q13.2	Start	42,380,407 bp
Band	22q13.2	End	42,432,403 bp

Gene location (Mouse)
Chr.	Chromosome 15 (mouse)
Band	15|15 E1	Start	82,877,174 bp
Band	15|15 E1	End	82,917,507 bp
RNA expression pattern
Bgee	Human / Mouse (ortholog); Top expressed in: monocyte; blood; granulocyte; skin of arm; pancreatic ductal cell; bone marrow cell; tendon of biceps brachii; spleen; buccal mucosa cell; appendix / Top expressed in: granulocyte; bone marrow; lumbar subsegment of spinal cord; blood; tibiofemoral joint; stroma of bone marrow; spleen; habenula; lip; genital tubercle; More reference expression data
BioGPS	n/a
Gene ontology
Molecular function	transmembrane signaling receptor activity
Cellular component	integral component of membrane; membrane; plasma membrane; azurophil granule membrane
Biological process	positive regulation of B cell receptor signaling pathway; cell surface receptor signaling pathway; positive regulation of DNA-binding transcription factor activity; intracellular signal transduction; inflammatory response; regulation of B cell differentiation; signal transduction; positive regulation of cytokine production; neutrophil degranulation; B cell differentiation
Sources:Amigo / QuickGO
Orthologs
Databases	NCBI: entry; OMA: entry
Species	Human	Mouse
Entrez	150372	74039
Ensembl	ENSG00000235568	ENSMUSG00000058099
UniProt	Q8NET5	Q8R4V1
RefSeq (mRNA)	NM_145912; NM_001318323; NM_001371362	NM_001271411; NM_001271412; NM_001271413; NM_001271414; NM_028728
RefSeq (protein)	NP_001305252; NP_666017; NP_001358291	NP_001258340; NP_001258341; NP_001258342; NP_001258343; NP_083004
Location (UCSC)	Chr 22: 42.38 – 42.43 Mb	Chr 15: 82.88 – 82.92 Mb
PubMed search
- Wikidata
View/Edit Human	View/Edit Mouse

NFAT activating protein with ITAM motif 1 is a protein that in humans is encoded by the NFAM1 gene.

== Function ==
The protein encoded by this gene is a type I membrane receptor that activates cytokine gene promoters such as the IL-13 and TNF-alpha promoters. The encoded protein contains an immunoreceptor tyrosine-based activation motif (ITAM) and is thought to regulate the signaling and development of B-cells. [provided by RefSeq, Jul 2008].
