= OR2A5 =

Protein-coding gene in the species Homo sapiens

Identifiers
- Aliases: OR2A5, OR2A11P, OR2A26, OR2A8, OR7-138, OR7-141, olfactory receptor family 2 subfamily A member 5
- External IDs: MGI: 3030282; GeneCards: OR2A5

Gene location (Human)
| Chr. | Chromosome 7 (human) |
| Band | 7q35 | Start | 144,048,948 bp |
| Band | 7q35 | End | 144,058,845 bp |

Gene location (Mouse)
| Chr. | Chromosome 6 (mouse) |
| Band | 6|6 B2.1 | Start | 42,867,375 bp |
| Band | 6|6 B2.1 | End | 42,876,019 bp |
RNA expression pattern
| Bgee | Human / Mouse (ortholog); Top expressed in: testicle; gonad; gastric mucosa; right adrenal cortex; rectum; muscle tissue; Descending thoracic aorta; skeletal muscle tissue; smooth muscle tissue; muscle of thigh / n/a; More reference expression data |
| BioGPS | n/a |
Gene ontology
| Molecular function | signal transducer activity; olfactory receptor activity; G protein-coupled receptor activity |
| Cellular component | plasma membrane; membrane; integral component of membrane |
| Biological process | sensory perception of smell; signal transduction; response to stimulus; detection of chemical stimulus involved in sensory perception of smell; G protein-coupled receptor signaling pathway |
Sources:Amigo / QuickGO
Orthologs
| Databases | NCBI: entry; OMA: entry |
| Species | Human | Mouse |
| Entrez | 393046 | 258270 |
| Ensembl | ENSG00000221836; ENSG00000284896 | ENSMUSG00000043119 |
| UniProt | Q96R48 | Q8VES9 |
| RefSeq (mRNA) | NM_012365 | NM_146273 |
| RefSeq (protein) | NP_036497 | NP_666385 |
| Location (UCSC) | Chr 7: 144.05 – 144.06 Mb | Chr 6: 42.87 – 42.88 Mb |
| PubMed search |
- Wikidata
| View/Edit Human | View/Edit Mouse |

Olfactory receptor 2A5 is a protein that in humans is encoded by the OR2A5 gene.

Olfactory receptors interact with odorant molecules in the nose, to initiate a neuronal response that triggers the perception of a smell. The olfactory receptor proteins are members of a large family of G-protein-coupled receptors (GPCR) arising from single coding-exon genes. Olfactory receptors share a 7-transmembrane domain structure with many neurotransmitter and hormone receptors and are responsible for the recognition and G protein-mediated transduction of odorant signals. The olfactory receptor gene family is the largest in the genome. The nomenclature assigned to the olfactory receptor genes and proteins for this organism is independent of other organisms.

== See also ==
- Olfactory receptor
