= OR2F1 =

Protein-coding gene in the species Homo sapiens

Identifiers
- Aliases: OR2F1, OLF3, OR14-60, OR2F3, OR2F3P, OR2F4, OR2F5, OR7-139, OR7-140, 7M1-2, olfactory receptor family 2 subfamily F member 1 (gene/pseudogene), olfactory receptor family 2 subfamily F member 1
- External IDs: OMIM: 608497; MGI: 3030287; GeneCards: OR2F1

Gene location (Human)
Chr.	Chromosome 7 (human)
Band	7q35	Start	143,954,844 bp
Band	7q35	End	143,997,312 bp

Gene location (Mouse)
Chr.	Chromosome 6 (mouse)
Band	6|6 B2.1	Start	42,716,305 bp
Band	6|6 B2.1	End	42,723,897 bp
RNA expression pattern
Bgee	Human / Mouse (ortholog); Top expressed in: tibial arteries; apex of heart; smooth muscle tissue; sural nerve; placenta; anterior cingulate cortex; ascending aorta; Descending thoracic aorta; appendix; right coronary artery / n/a; More reference expression data
BioGPS	n/a
Gene ontology
Molecular function	signal transducer activity; G protein-coupled receptor activity; olfactory receptor activity
Cellular component	membrane; integral component of membrane; plasma membrane
Biological process	response to stimulus; signal transduction; sensory perception of smell; detection of chemical stimulus involved in sensory perception of smell; G protein-coupled receptor signaling pathway
Sources:Amigo / QuickGO
Orthologs
Databases	NCBI: entry; OMA: entry
Species	Human	Mouse
Entrez	26211	258016
Ensembl	ENSG00000284866; ENSG00000213215	ENSMUSG00000095831
UniProt	Q13607	Q7TRV7
RefSeq (mRNA)	NM_012369	NM_001011799
RefSeq (protein)	NP_036501	NP_001011799
Location (UCSC)	Chr 7: 143.95 – 144 Mb	Chr 6: 42.72 – 42.72 Mb
PubMed search
- Wikidata
View/Edit Human	View/Edit Mouse

Olfactory receptor 2F1 is a protein that in humans is encoded by the OR2F1 gene.

Olfactory receptors interact with odorant molecules in the nose, to initiate a neuronal response that triggers the perception of a smell. The olfactory receptor proteins are members of a large family of G-protein-coupled receptors (GPCR) arising from single coding-exon genes. Olfactory receptors share a 7-transmembrane domain structure with many neurotransmitter and hormone receptors and are responsible for the recognition and G protein-mediated transduction of odorant signals. The olfactory receptor gene family is the largest in the genome. The nomenclature assigned to the olfactory receptor genes and proteins for this organism is independent of other organisms.

== See also ==
- Olfactory receptor
