= OR4C6 =

Protein-coding gene in the species Homo sapiens

Identifiers
- Aliases: OR4C6, OR11-138, olfactory receptor family 4 subfamily C member 6
- External IDs: MGI: 3031064; GeneCards: OR4C6

Gene location (Human)
| Chr. | Chromosome 11 (human) |
| Band | 11q11 | Start | 55,662,201 bp |
| Band | 11q11 | End | 55,666,195 bp |

Gene location (Mouse)
| Chr. | Chromosome 2 (mouse) |
| Band | 2|2 E1 | Start | 89,126,695 bp |
| Band | 2|2 E1 | End | 89,127,612 bp |
RNA expression pattern
| Bgee | Human / Mouse (ortholog); Top expressed in: lymph node; prostate; tonsil / Top expressed in: respiratory epithelium; sensory nervous system; body proper; sensory organ; nasal epithelium; olfactory epithelium; More reference expression data |
| BioGPS | n/a |
Gene ontology
| Molecular function | G protein-coupled receptor activity; olfactory receptor activity; transmembrane signaling receptor activity; signal transducer activity |
| Cellular component | integral component of membrane; plasma membrane; membrane |
| Biological process | sensory perception of smell; detection of chemical stimulus involved in sensory perception of smell; detection of chemical stimulus involved in sensory perception; signal transduction; response to stimulus; G protein-coupled receptor signaling pathway |
Sources:Amigo / QuickGO
Orthologs
| Databases | NCBI: entry; OMA: entry |
| Species | Human | Mouse |
| Entrez | 219432 | 258785 |
| Ensembl | ENSG00000181903 | ENSMUSG00000075094 |
| UniProt | Q8NH72 | Q8VG58 |
| RefSeq (mRNA) | NM_001004704 | NM_146789 |
| RefSeq (protein) | NP_001004704 | NP_667000 |
| Location (UCSC) | Chr 11: 55.66 – 55.67 Mb | Chr 2: 89.13 – 89.13 Mb |
| PubMed search |
- Wikidata
| View/Edit Human | View/Edit Mouse |

Olfactory receptor 4C6 is a protein that in humans is encoded by the OR4C6 gene.

Olfactory receptors interact with odorant molecules in the nose, to initiate a neuronal response that triggers the perception of a smell. The olfactory receptor proteins are members of a large family of G-protein-coupled receptors (GPCR) arising from single coding-exon genes. Olfactory receptors share a 7-transmembrane domain structure with many neurotransmitter and hormone receptors and are responsible for the recognition and G protein-mediated transduction of odorant signals. The olfactory receptor gene family is the largest in the genome. The nomenclature assigned to the olfactory receptor genes and proteins for this organism is independent of other organisms.

== See also ==
- Olfactory receptor
