= OR2M3 =

Protein-coding gene in humans

Identifiers
- Aliases: OR2M3, OR1-54, OR2M3P, OR2M6, OST003, olfactory receptor family 2 subfamily M member 3
- External IDs: MGI: 3029998; GeneCards: OR2M3

Gene location (Human)
Chr.	Chromosome 1 (human)
Band	1q44	Start	248,197,265 bp
Band	1q44	End	248,212,925 bp

Gene location (Mouse)
Chr.	Chromosome 16 (mouse)
Band	16|16 A3	Start	19,102,854 bp
Band	16|16 A3	End	19,132,814 bp
RNA expression pattern
Bgee	Human / Mouse (ortholog); Top expressed in: mucosa of transverse colon; sural nerve; rectum; endometrium; renal cortex; prefrontal cortex; muscle layer of sigmoid colon; fundus / Top expressed in: spleen; uterus; thymus; duodenum; More reference expression data
BioGPS	n/a
Gene ontology
Molecular function	G protein-coupled receptor activity; olfactory receptor activity; signal transducer activity
Cellular component	integral component of membrane; plasma membrane; membrane
Biological process	sensory perception of smell; signal transduction; response to stimulus; detection of chemical stimulus involved in sensory perception of smell; G protein-coupled receptor signaling pathway
Sources:Amigo / QuickGO
Orthologs
Databases	NCBI: entry; OMA: entry
Species	Human	Mouse
Entrez	127062	258443
Ensembl	ENSG00000228198	ENSMUSG00000050742
UniProt	Q8NG83	Q8VF87
RefSeq (mRNA)	NM_001004689	NM_146451
RefSeq (protein)	NP_001004689	NP_666662
Location (UCSC)	Chr 1: 248.2 – 248.21 Mb	Chr 16: 19.1 – 19.13 Mb
PubMed search
- Wikidata
View/Edit Human	View/Edit Mouse

Olfactory receptor 2M3 is a protein that in humans is encoded by the OR2M3 gene.

Olfactory receptors interact with odorant molecules in the nose, to initiate a neuronal response that triggers the perception of a smell. The olfactory receptor proteins are members of a large family of G-protein-coupled receptors (GPCR) arising from single coding-exon genes. Olfactory receptors share a 7-transmembrane domain structure with many neurotransmitter and hormone receptors and are responsible for the recognition and G protein-mediated transduction of odorant signals. The olfactory receptor gene family is the largest in the genome. The nomenclature assigned to the olfactory receptor genes and proteins for this organism is independent of other organisms.

OR2M3 has a copper binding pocket.

== Ligands ==
- 3-Mercapto-2-methylpentan-1-ol

This chemical is associated with characteristic smell of raw onions.

== See also ==
- Olfactory receptor
