= OR4F3 =

Protein-coding gene in the species Homo sapiens

Identifiers
- Aliases: OR4F3, olfactory receptor family 4 subfamily F member 3
- External IDs: MGI: 3031137; GeneCards: OR4F3

Gene location (Human)
Chr.	Chromosome 5 (human)
Band	5q35.3	Start	181,367,268 bp
Band	5q35.3	End	181,368,262 bp

Gene location (Mouse)
Chr.	Chromosome 2 (mouse)
Band	2|2 E3	Start	111,642,592 bp
Band	2|2 E3	End	111,650,685 bp
RNA expression pattern
Bgee	Human / Mouse (ortholog); Top expressed in: right lobe of liver; duodenum; rectum; placenta; islet of Langerhans; tibial nerve; right lobe of thyroid gland; myometrium; temporal lobe; amygdala / n/a; More reference expression data
BioGPS	n/a
Gene ontology
Molecular function	G protein-coupled receptor activity; olfactory receptor activity; transmembrane signaling receptor activity; signal transducer activity
Cellular component	integral component of membrane; plasma membrane; membrane
Biological process	sensory perception of smell; detection of chemical stimulus involved in sensory perception of smell; detection of chemical stimulus involved in sensory perception; signal transduction; response to stimulus; G protein-coupled receptor signaling pathway
Sources:Amigo / QuickGO
Orthologs
Databases	NCBI: entry; OMA: entry
Species	Human	Mouse
Entrez	26683	258397
Ensembl	ENSG00000230178	ENSMUSG00000093804
UniProt	Q6IEY1	A2AVW1
RefSeq (mRNA)	NM_001005224	NM_146402
RefSeq (protein)	NP_001005224; NP_001005221; NP_001005277	NP_666514
Location (UCSC)	Chr 5: 181.37 – 181.37 Mb	Chr 2: 111.64 – 111.65 Mb
PubMed search
- Wikidata
View/Edit Human	View/Edit Mouse

Olfactory receptor 4F3/4F16/4F29 is a protein that in humans is encoded by the OR4F3 gene.

Olfactory receptors interact with odorant molecules in the nose, to initiate a neuronal response that triggers the perception of a smell. The olfactory receptor proteins are members of a large family of G-protein-coupled receptors (GPCR) arising from single coding-exon genes. Olfactory receptors share a 7-transmembrane domain structure with many neurotransmitter and hormone receptors and are responsible for the recognition and G protein-mediated transduction of odorant signals. The olfactory receptor gene family is the largest in the genome. The nomenclature assigned to the olfactory receptor genes and proteins for this organism is independent of other organisms.

== See also ==
- Olfactory receptor
