= OR4N4 =

Protein-coding gene in the species Homo sapiens

Identifiers
- Aliases: OR4N4, OR15-1, OR15-5, olfactory receptor family 4 subfamily N member 4
- External IDs: MGI: 3030566; GeneCards: OR4N4

Gene location (Human)
Chr.	Chromosome 15 (human)
Band	15q11.2	Start	22,094,522 bp
Band	15q11.2	End	22,095,472 bp

Gene location (Mouse)
Chr.	Chromosome 14 (mouse)
Band	14|14 C1	Start	50,515,930 bp
Band	14|14 C1	End	50,521,663 bp
RNA expression pattern
Bgee	Human / Mouse (ortholog); Top expressed in: testicle; gonad; left testis; right testis; muscle of thigh; heart; tibial nerve / Top expressed in: testicle; More reference expression data
BioGPS	n/a
Gene ontology
Molecular function	G protein-coupled receptor activity; olfactory receptor activity; transmembrane signaling receptor activity; signal transducer activity
Cellular component	membrane; plasma membrane; integral component of membrane
Biological process	sensory perception of smell; detection of chemical stimulus involved in sensory perception of smell; detection of chemical stimulus involved in sensory perception; signal transduction; response to stimulus; G protein-coupled receptor signaling pathway
Sources:Amigo / QuickGO
Orthologs
Databases	NCBI: entry; OMA: entry
Species	Human	Mouse
Entrez	283694	258659
Ensembl	ENSG00000183706	ENSMUSG00000091873
UniProt	Q8N0Y3	Q8VFT5
RefSeq (mRNA)	NM_001005241	NM_146665
RefSeq (protein)	NP_001005241	NP_666876
Location (UCSC)	Chr 15: 22.09 – 22.1 Mb	Chr 14: 50.52 – 50.52 Mb
PubMed search
- Wikidata
View/Edit Human	View/Edit Mouse

Olfactory receptor 4N4 is a protein that in humans is encoded by the OR4N4 gene.

Olfactory receptors interact with odorant molecules in the nose, to initiate a neuronal response that triggers the perception of a smell. The olfactory receptor proteins are members of a large family of G-protein-coupled receptors (GPCR) arising from single coding-exon genes. Olfactory receptors share a 7-transmembrane domain structure with many neurotransmitter and hormone receptors and are responsible for the recognition and G protein-mediated transduction of odorant signals. The olfactory receptor gene family is the largest in the genome. The nomenclature assigned to the olfactory receptor genes and proteins for this organism is independent of other organisms.

== See also ==
- Olfactory receptor
