= OR4F4 =

Protein-coding gene in the species Homo sapiens

Identifiers
- Aliases: OR4F4, OLA-7501, OR4F18, olfactory receptor family 4 subfamily F member 4
- External IDs: MGI: 3031123; GeneCards: OR4F4

Gene location (Human)
Chr.	Chromosome 15 (human)
Band	15q26.3	Start	101,922,042 bp
Band	15q26.3	End	101,923,113 bp

Gene location (Mouse)
Chr.	Chromosome 2 (mouse)
Band	2|2 E3	Start	111,311,164 bp
Band	2|2 E3	End	111,314,960 bp
RNA expression pattern
Bgee	Human / Mouse (ortholog); Top expressed in: sural nerve; fundus; blood; muscle of leg; heart; esophagus; adrenal gland / Top expressed in: embryo; More reference expression data
BioGPS	n/a
Gene ontology
Molecular function	G protein-coupled receptor activity; olfactory receptor activity; transmembrane signaling receptor activity; signal transducer activity
Cellular component	integral component of membrane; plasma membrane; membrane
Biological process	sensory perception of smell; detection of chemical stimulus involved in sensory perception of smell; detection of chemical stimulus involved in sensory perception; signal transduction; response to stimulus; G protein-coupled receptor signaling pathway
Sources:Amigo / QuickGO
Orthologs
Databases	NCBI: entry; OMA: entry
Species	Human	Mouse
Entrez	26682	258399
Ensembl	ENSG00000177693	ENSMUSG00000061195
UniProt	Q96R69	Q8VF49
RefSeq (mRNA)	NM_001004195	NM_146404
RefSeq (protein)	NP_001004195	NP_666516
Location (UCSC)	Chr 15: 101.92 – 101.92 Mb	Chr 2: 111.31 – 111.31 Mb
PubMed search
- Wikidata
View/Edit Human	View/Edit Mouse

Olfactory receptor 4F4 is a protein that in humans is encoded by the OR4F4 gene.

Olfactory receptors interact with odorant molecules in the nose, to initiate a neuronal response that triggers the perception of a smell. The olfactory receptor proteins are members of a large family of G-protein-coupled receptors (GPCR) arising from single coding-exon genes. Olfactory receptors share a 7-transmembrane domain structure with many neurotransmitter and hormone receptors and are responsible for the recognition and G protein-mediated transduction of odorant signals. The olfactory receptor gene family is the largest in the genome. The nomenclature assigned to the olfactory receptor genes and proteins for this organism is independent of other organisms.

== See also ==
- Olfactory receptor
