= OR4L1 =

Protein-coding gene in the species Homo sapiens

Identifiers
- Aliases: OR4L1, OR14-28, OR4L2P, olfactory receptor family 4 subfamily L member 1, olfactory receptor family 4 subfamily L member 1 (gene/pseudogene)
- External IDs: MGI: 3030558; GeneCards: OR4L1

Gene location (Human)
Chr.	Chromosome 14 (human)
Band	14q11.2	Start	20,060,045 bp
Band	14q11.2	End	20,060,983 bp

Gene location (Mouse)
Chr.	Chromosome 14 (mouse)
Band	14|14 C1	Start	50,197,480 bp
Band	14|14 C1	End	50,200,731 bp
RNA expression pattern
Bgee	Human / Mouse (ortholog); Top expressed in: testicle; fundus / n/a; More reference expression data
BioGPS	n/a
Gene ontology
Molecular function	G protein-coupled receptor activity; olfactory receptor activity; transmembrane signaling receptor activity; signal transducer activity
Cellular component	integral component of membrane; plasma membrane; membrane
Biological process	sensory perception of smell; detection of chemical stimulus involved in sensory perception of smell; detection of chemical stimulus involved in sensory perception; signal transduction; response to stimulus; G protein-coupled receptor signaling pathway
Sources:Amigo / QuickGO
Orthologs
Databases	NCBI: entry; OMA: entry
Species	Human	Mouse
Entrez	122742	258485
Ensembl	ENSG00000176246	ENSMUSG00000096254
UniProt	Q8NH43	K7N5X7
RefSeq (mRNA)	NM_001004717	NM_146492
RefSeq (protein)	NP_001004717	NP_666703
Location (UCSC)	Chr 14: 20.06 – 20.06 Mb	Chr 14: 50.2 – 50.2 Mb
PubMed search
- Wikidata
View/Edit Human	View/Edit Mouse

Olfactory receptor 4L1 is a protein that in humans is encoded by the OR4L1 gene.

Olfactory receptors interact with odorant molecules in the nose, to initiate a neuronal response that triggers the perception of a smell. The olfactory receptor proteins are members of a large family of G-protein-coupled receptors (GPCR) arising from single coding-exon genes. Olfactory receptors share a 7-transmembrane domain structure with many neurotransmitter and hormone receptors and are responsible for the recognition and G protein-mediated transduction of odorant signals. The olfactory receptor gene family is the largest in the genome. The nomenclature assigned to the olfactory receptor genes and proteins for this organism is independent of other organisms.

== See also ==
- Olfactory receptor
