= OR1J2 =

Protein-coding gene in the species Homo sapiens

Identifiers
- Aliases: OR1J2, HG152, HSA5, OR1J3, OR1J5, OR9-19, OST044, olfactory receptor family 1 subfamily J member 2
- External IDs: MGI: 3030182; GeneCards: OR1J2

Gene location (Human)
Chr.	Chromosome 9 (human)
Band	9q33.2	Start	122,510,802 bp
Band	9q33.2	End	122,511,743 bp

Gene location (Mouse)
Chr.	Chromosome 2 (mouse)
Band	2|2 B	Start	36,674,288 bp
Band	2|2 B	End	36,680,010 bp
RNA expression pattern
Bgee	Human / Mouse (ortholog); Top expressed in: testicle; buccal mucosa cell; endometrium; gastric mucosa; stromal cell of endometrium; urinary bladder; right lung; gallbladder / n/a; More reference expression data
BioGPS	n/a
Gene ontology
Molecular function	G protein-coupled receptor activity; olfactory receptor activity; signal transducer activity
Cellular component	integral component of membrane; plasma membrane; membrane
Biological process	sensory perception of smell; signal transduction; response to stimulus; detection of chemical stimulus involved in sensory perception of smell; G protein-coupled receptor signaling pathway
Sources:Amigo / QuickGO
Orthologs
Databases	NCBI: entry; OMA: entry
Species	Human	Mouse
Entrez	26740	258946
Ensembl	ENSG00000197233	ENSMUSG00000049315
UniProt	Q8NGS2	Q8VGK3
RefSeq (mRNA)	NM_054107	NM_146944
RefSeq (protein)	NP_473448	NP_667155
Location (UCSC)	Chr 9: 122.51 – 122.51 Mb	Chr 2: 36.67 – 36.68 Mb
PubMed search
- Wikidata
View/Edit Human	View/Edit Mouse

Olfactory receptor 1J2 is a protein that in humans is encoded by the OR1J2 gene.

Olfactory receptors interact with odorant molecules in the nose, to initiate a neuronal response that triggers the perception of a smell. The olfactory receptor proteins are members of a large family of G-protein-coupled receptors (GPCR) arising from single coding-exon genes. Olfactory receptors share a 7-transmembrane domain structure with many neurotransmitter and hormone receptors and are responsible for the recognition and G protein-mediated transduction of odorant signals. The olfactory receptor gene family is the largest in the genome. The nomenclature assigned to the olfactory receptor genes and proteins for this organism is independent of other organisms.

== See also ==
- Olfactory receptor
