= OR2T33 =

Protein-coding gene in humans

Identifiers
- Aliases: OR2T33, OR1-56, olfactory receptor family 2 subfamily T member 33, OR2T32
- External IDs: MGI: 3030148; GeneCards: OR2T33

Gene location (Human)
Chr.	Chromosome 1 (human)
Band	1q44	Start	248,269,917 bp
Band	1q44	End	248,277,976 bp

Gene location (Mouse)
Chr.	Chromosome 11 (mouse)
Band	11|11 B1.3	Start	58,673,778 bp
Band	11|11 B1.3	End	58,679,594 bp
RNA expression pattern
Bgee	Human / Mouse (ortholog); Top expressed in: testicle; gonad; monocyte; bone marrow; blood; left lobe of thyroid gland; smooth muscle tissue; prefrontal cortex; right lobe of thyroid gland; primary visual cortex / n/a; More reference expression data
BioGPS	n/a
Gene ontology
Molecular function	G protein-coupled receptor activity; olfactory receptor activity; signal transducer activity
Cellular component	integral component of membrane; plasma membrane; membrane
Biological process	sensory perception of smell; signal transduction; response to stimulus; detection of chemical stimulus involved in sensory perception of smell; G protein-coupled receptor signaling pathway
Sources:Amigo / QuickGO
Orthologs
Databases	NCBI: entry; OMA: entry
Species	Human	Mouse
Entrez	391195	257917
Ensembl	ENSG00000177212	ENSMUSG00000059504
UniProt	Q8NG76	Q7TRZ7
RefSeq (mRNA)	NM_001004695	NM_001011760
RefSeq (protein)	NP_001004695	NP_001011760
Location (UCSC)	Chr 1: 248.27 – 248.28 Mb	Chr 11: 58.67 – 58.68 Mb
PubMed search
- Wikidata
View/Edit Human	View/Edit Mouse

Olfactory receptor 2T33 is a protein that in humans is encoded by the OR2T33 gene.

Olfactory receptors interact with odorant molecules in the nose, to initiate a neuronal response that triggers the perception of a smell. The olfactory receptor proteins are members of a large family of G-protein-coupled receptors (GPCR) arising from single coding-exon genes. Olfactory receptors share a 7-transmembrane domain structure with many neurotransmitter and hormone receptors and are responsible for the recognition and G protein-mediated transduction of odorant signals. The olfactory receptor gene family is the largest in the genome. The nomenclature assigned to the olfactory receptor genes and proteins for this organism is independent of other organisms.

== See also ==
- Olfactory receptor
