= OR2V2 =

Protein-coding gene in the species Homo sapiens

Identifiers
- Aliases: OR2V2, OR2V3, OST713, olfactory receptor family 2 subfamily V member 2
- External IDs: MGI: 3031230; GeneCards: OR2V2

Gene location (Human)
Chr.	Chromosome 5 (human)
Band	5q35.3	Start	181,147,586 bp
Band	5q35.3	End	181,159,285 bp

Gene location (Mouse)
Chr.	Chromosome 11 (mouse)
Band	11|11 B1.2	Start	49,000,809 bp
Band	11|11 B1.2	End	49,005,701 bp
RNA expression pattern
Bgee	Human / Mouse (ortholog); Top expressed in: right uterine tube / Top expressed in: adrenal gland; human kidney; right kidney; proximal tubule; heart; white adipose tissue; pancreas; islet of Langerhans; quadriceps femoris muscle; urinary bladder; More reference expression data
BioGPS	n/a
Gene ontology
Molecular function	G protein-coupled receptor activity; olfactory receptor activity; signal transducer activity
Cellular component	integral component of membrane; plasma membrane; membrane
Biological process	sensory perception of smell; signal transduction; response to stimulus; detection of chemical stimulus involved in sensory perception of smell; G protein-coupled receptor signaling pathway
Sources:Amigo / QuickGO
Orthologs
Databases	NCBI: entry; OMA: entry
Species	Human	Mouse
Entrez	285659	258334
Ensembl	ENSG00000182613	ENSMUSG00000047511
UniProt	Q96R30	n/a
RefSeq (mRNA)	NM_206880	NM_146337
RefSeq (protein)	NP_996763	n/a
Location (UCSC)	Chr 5: 181.15 – 181.16 Mb	Chr 11: 49 – 49.01 Mb
PubMed search
- Wikidata
View/Edit Human	View/Edit Mouse

Olfactory receptor 2V2 is a protein that in humans is encoded by the OR2V2 gene.

Olfactory receptors interact with odorant molecules in the nose, to initiate a neuronal response that triggers the perception of a smell. The olfactory receptor proteins are members of a large family of G-protein-coupled receptors (GPCR) arising from single coding-exon genes. Olfactory receptors share a 7-transmembrane domain structure with many neurotransmitter and hormone receptors and are responsible for the recognition and G protein-mediated transduction of odorant signals. The olfactory receptor gene family is the largest in the genome. The nomenclature assigned to the olfactory receptor genes and proteins for this organism is independent of other organisms.

== See also ==
- Olfactory receptor
