= OR2A1 =

Protein-coding gene in the species Homo sapiens

Identifiers
- Aliases: OR2A1, olfactory receptor family 2 subfamily A member 1
- External IDs: MGI: 3030269; GeneCards: OR2A1

Gene location (Human)
Chr.	Chromosome 7 (human)
Band	7q35	Start	144,312,419 bp
Band	7q35	End	144,322,737 bp

Gene location (Mouse)
Chr.	Chromosome 6 (mouse)
Band	6|6 B2.1	Start	43,174,080 bp
Band	6|6 B2.1	End	43,180,563 bp
RNA expression pattern
Bgee	Human / Mouse (ortholog); Top expressed in: gonad; testicle; sural nerve; Achilles tendon; left lobe of thyroid gland; right lobe of thyroid gland; stromal cell of endometrium; bone marrow; ovary; left ovary / n/a; More reference expression data
BioGPS	n/a
Gene ontology
Molecular function	G protein-coupled receptor activity; olfactory receptor activity; signal transducer activity
Cellular component	integral component of membrane; plasma membrane; membrane
Biological process	sensory perception of smell; signal transduction; response to stimulus; detection of chemical stimulus involved in sensory perception of smell; G protein-coupled receptor signaling pathway
Sources:Amigo / QuickGO
Orthologs
Databases	NCBI: entry; OMA: entry
Species	Human	Mouse
Entrez	346528	258647
Ensembl	ENSG00000221970	ENSMUSG00000048693
UniProt	Q8NGT9	Q8VFS3
RefSeq (mRNA)	NM_001005287	NM_146653
RefSeq (protein)	NP_001005287	NP_666864
Location (UCSC)	Chr 7: 144.31 – 144.32 Mb	Chr 6: 43.17 – 43.18 Mb
PubMed search
- Wikidata
View/Edit Human	View/Edit Mouse

Olfactory receptor 2A1/2A42 is a protein that in humans is encoded by the OR2A1 gene.

Olfactory receptors interact with odorant molecules in the nose, to initiate a neuronal response that triggers the perception of a smell. The olfactory receptor proteins are members of a large family of G-protein-coupled receptors (GPCR) arising from single coding-exon genes. Olfactory receptors share a 7-transmembrane domain structure with many neurotransmitter and hormone receptors and are responsible for the recognition and G protein-mediated transduction of odorant signals. The olfactory receptor gene family is the largest in the genome. The nomenclature assigned to the olfactory receptor genes and proteins for this organism is independent of other organisms.

== See also ==
- Olfactory receptor
