= OR4C16 =

Protein-coding gene in the species Homo sapiens

Identifiers
- Aliases: OR4C16, OR11-135, olfactory receptor family 4 subfamily C member 16 (gene/pseudogene), olfactory receptor family 4 subfamily C member 16
- External IDs: MGI: 3031043; GeneCards: OR4C16

Gene location (Human)
Chr.	Chromosome 11 (human)
Band	11q11	Start	55,572,128 bp
Band	11q11	End	55,573,060 bp

Gene location (Mouse)
Chr.	Chromosome 2 (mouse)
Band	2|2 E1	Start	88,735,286 bp
Band	2|2 E1	End	88,745,501 bp
RNA expression pattern
Bgee	Human / Mouse (ortholog); Top expressed in: sural nerve / n/a; More reference expression data
BioGPS	n/a
Gene ontology
Molecular function	G protein-coupled receptor activity; olfactory receptor activity; transmembrane signaling receptor activity; signal transducer activity
Cellular component	integral component of membrane; plasma membrane; membrane
Biological process	sensory perception of smell; detection of chemical stimulus involved in sensory perception of smell; detection of chemical stimulus involved in sensory perception; signal transduction; response to stimulus; G protein-coupled receptor signaling pathway
Sources:Amigo / QuickGO
Orthologs
Databases	NCBI: entry; OMA: entry
Species	Human	Mouse
Entrez	219428	258453
Ensembl	ENSG00000279514	ENSMUSG00000075113
UniProt	Q8NGL9	Q3SXJ3
RefSeq (mRNA)	NM_001004701	NM_146461
RefSeq (protein)	NP_001004701	NP_666672
Location (UCSC)	Chr 11: 55.57 – 55.57 Mb	Chr 2: 88.74 – 88.75 Mb
PubMed search
- Wikidata
View/Edit Human	View/Edit Mouse

Olfactory receptor 4C16 is a protein that in humans is encoded by the OR4C16 gene.

Olfactory receptors interact with odorant molecules in the nose, to initiate a neuronal response that triggers the perception of a smell. The olfactory receptor proteins are members of a large family of G-protein-coupled receptors (GPCR) arising from single coding-exon genes. Olfactory receptors share a 7-transmembrane domain structure with many neurotransmitter and hormone receptors and are responsible for the recognition and G protein-mediated transduction of odorant signals. The olfactory receptor gene family is the largest in the genome. The nomenclature assigned to the olfactory receptor genes and proteins for this organism is independent of other organisms.

== See also ==
- Olfactory receptor
