= OR2D2 =

Protein-coding gene in the species Homo sapiens

Identifiers
- Aliases: OR2D2, OR11-610, OR2D1, hg27, olfactory receptor family 2 subfamily D member 2
- External IDs: OMIM: 608494; MGI: 3647188; GeneCards: OR2D2

Gene location (Human)
Chr.	Chromosome 11 (human)
Band	11p15.4	Start	6,891,574 bp
Band	11p15.4	End	6,892,500 bp

Gene location (Mouse)
Chr.	Chromosome 7 (mouse)
Band	7|7 E3	Start	106,702,955 bp
Band	7|7 E3	End	106,709,576 bp
RNA expression pattern
Bgee	Human / Mouse (ortholog); Top expressed in: mucosa of transverse colon; right uterine tube; endocrine system; endocrine gland; thyroid gland; left lobe of thyroid gland / n/a; More reference expression data
BioGPS	n/a
Gene ontology
Molecular function	G protein-coupled receptor activity; olfactory receptor activity; signal transducer activity
Cellular component	integral component of membrane; plasma membrane; membrane
Biological process	sensory perception of smell; signal transduction; response to stimulus; detection of chemical stimulus involved in sensory perception of smell; G protein-coupled receptor signaling pathway
Sources:Amigo / QuickGO
Orthologs
Databases	NCBI: entry; OMA: entry
Species	Human	Mouse
Entrez	120776	384732
Ensembl	ENSG00000166368	ENSMUSG00000062987
UniProt	Q9H210	E9Q725
RefSeq (mRNA)	NM_003700	NM_001162940
RefSeq (protein)	NP_003691	NP_001156412
Location (UCSC)	Chr 11: 6.89 – 6.89 Mb	Chr 7: 106.7 – 106.71 Mb
PubMed search
- Wikidata
View/Edit Human	View/Edit Mouse

Olfactory receptor 2D2 is a protein that in humans is encoded by the OR2D2 gene.

Olfactory receptors interact with odorant molecules in the nose, to initiate a neuronal response that triggers the perception of a smell. The olfactory receptor proteins are members of a large family of G-protein-coupled receptors (GPCR) arising from single coding-exon genes. Olfactory receptors share a 7-transmembrane domain structure with many neurotransmitter and hormone receptors and are responsible for the recognition and G protein-mediated transduction of odorant signals. The olfactory receptor gene family is the largest in the genome. The nomenclature assigned to the olfactory receptor genes and proteins for this organism is independent of other organisms.

== See also ==
- Olfactory receptor
