= OR4F5 =

Protein-coding gene in humans

Identifiers
- Aliases: OR4F5, olfactory receptor family 4 subfamily F member 5
- External IDs: MGI: 3031123; GeneCards: OR4F5

Gene location (Human)
Chr.	Chromosome 1 (human)
Band	1p36.33	Start	65,419 bp
Band	1p36.33	End	71,585 bp

Gene location (Mouse)
Chr.	Chromosome 2 (mouse)
Band	2|2 E3	Start	111,311,164 bp
Band	2|2 E3	End	111,314,960 bp
RNA expression pattern
Bgee	Human / Mouse (ortholog); Top expressed in: testicle / Top expressed in: embryo; More reference expression data
BioGPS	n/a
Gene ontology
Molecular function	G protein-coupled receptor activity; olfactory receptor activity; transmembrane signaling receptor activity; signal transducer activity
Cellular component	integral component of membrane; plasma membrane; membrane
Biological process	sensory perception of smell; detection of chemical stimulus involved in sensory perception of smell; detection of chemical stimulus involved in sensory perception; signal transduction; response to stimulus; G protein-coupled receptor signaling pathway
Sources:Amigo / QuickGO
Orthologs
Databases	NCBI: entry; OMA: entry
Species	Human	Mouse
Entrez	79501	258399
Ensembl	ENSG00000186092	ENSMUSG00000061195
UniProt	Q8NH21	Q8VF49
RefSeq (mRNA)	NM_001005484	NM_146404
RefSeq (protein)	NP_001005484	NP_666516
Location (UCSC)	Chr 1: 0.07 – 0.07 Mb	Chr 2: 111.31 – 111.31 Mb
PubMed search
- Wikidata
View/Edit Human	View/Edit Mouse

Olfactory receptor family 4 subfamily F member 5 is a protein that in humans is encoded by the OR4F5 gene.

== Function ==
Olfactory receptors interact with odorant molecules in the nose, to initiate a neuronal response that triggers the perception of a smell. The olfactory receptor proteins are members of a large family of G-protein-coupled receptors (GPCR) arising from single coding-exon genes. Olfactory receptors share a 7-transmembrane domain structure with many neurotransmitter and hormone receptors and are responsible for the recognition and G protein-mediated transduction of odorant signals. The olfactory receptor gene family is the largest in the genome. The nomenclature assigned to the olfactory receptor genes and proteins for this organism is independent of other organisms.

== Trivia ==
OR4F5 is the first protein coding gene on human chromosome 1.
