= OR4K5 =

Protein-coding gene in the species Homo sapiens

Identifiers
- Aliases: OR4K5, OR14-16, olfactory receptor family 4 subfamily K member 5
- External IDs: MGI: 3030563; GeneCards: OR4K5

Gene location (Human)
Chr.	Chromosome 14 (human)
Band	14q11.2	Start	19,920,607 bp
Band	14q11.2	End	19,921,578 bp

Gene location (Mouse)
Chr.	Chromosome 14 (mouse)
Band	14|14 C1	Start	50,382,188 bp
Band	14|14 C1	End	50,390,367 bp
RNA expression pattern
Bgee	Human / Mouse (ortholog); Top expressed in: brain; cerebral cortex; multicellular organism / n/a; More reference expression data
BioGPS	n/a
Gene ontology
Molecular function	G protein-coupled receptor activity; olfactory receptor activity; transmembrane signaling receptor activity; signal transducer activity
Cellular component	integral component of membrane; plasma membrane; membrane
Biological process	sensory perception of smell; detection of chemical stimulus involved in sensory perception of smell; detection of chemical stimulus involved in sensory perception; signal transduction; response to stimulus; G protein-coupled receptor signaling pathway
Sources:Amigo / QuickGO
Orthologs
Databases	NCBI: entry; OMA: entry
Species	Human	Mouse
Entrez	79317	258275
Ensembl	ENSG00000176281	ENSMUSG00000049011
UniProt	Q8NGD3	Q8VET4
RefSeq (mRNA)	NM_001005483	NM_146278
RefSeq (protein)	NP_001005483	NP_666390
Location (UCSC)	Chr 14: 19.92 – 19.92 Mb	Chr 14: 50.38 – 50.39 Mb
PubMed search
- Wikidata
View/Edit Human	View/Edit Mouse

Olfactory receptor 4K5 is a protein that in humans is encoded by the OR4K5 gene.

Olfactory receptors interact with odorant molecules in the nose, to initiate a neuronal response that triggers the perception of a smell. The olfactory receptor proteins are members of a large family of G-protein-coupled receptors (GPCR) arising from single coding-exon genes. Olfactory receptors share a 7-transmembrane domain structure with many neurotransmitter and hormone receptors and are responsible for the recognition and G protein-mediated transduction of odorant signals. The olfactory receptor gene family is the largest in the genome. The nomenclature assigned to the olfactory receptor genes and proteins for this organism is independent of other organisms.

== See also ==
- Olfactory receptor
