= OR5AC2 =

Protein-coding gene in the species Homo sapiens

Identifiers
- Aliases: OR5AC2, HSA1, olfactory receptor family 5 subfamily AC member 2
- External IDs: MGI: 3030032; GeneCards: OR5AC2

Gene location (Human)
Chr.	Chromosome 3 (human)
Band	3q11.2	Start	98,087,173 bp
Band	3q11.2	End	98,088,102 bp

Gene location (Mouse)
Chr.	Chromosome 16 (mouse)
Band	16|16 C1.3	Start	59,020,715 bp
Band	16|16 C1.3	End	59,023,896 bp
RNA expression pattern
Bgee	Human / Mouse (ortholog); Top expressed in: temporal lobe; testicle; thoracic aorta; brain; ascending aorta; multicellular organism / n/a; More reference expression data
BioGPS	n/a
Gene ontology
Molecular function	G protein-coupled receptor activity; odorant binding; olfactory receptor activity; signal transducer activity
Cellular component	integral component of membrane; plasma membrane; membrane
Biological process	sensory perception of smell; signal transduction; response to stimulus; detection of chemical stimulus involved in sensory perception of smell; G protein-coupled receptor signaling pathway
Sources:Amigo / QuickGO
Orthologs
Databases	NCBI: entry; OMA: entry
Species	Human	Mouse
Entrez	81050	258036
Ensembl	ENSG00000196578	ENSMUSG00000052537
UniProt	Q9NZP5	Q7TS40
RefSeq (mRNA)	NM_054106	NM_001011808
RefSeq (protein)	NP_473447	NP_001011808
Location (UCSC)	Chr 3: 98.09 – 98.09 Mb	Chr 16: 59.02 – 59.02 Mb
PubMed search
- Wikidata
View/Edit Human	View/Edit Mouse

Olfactory receptor 5AC2 is a protein that in humans is encoded by the OR5AC2 gene.

Olfactory receptors interact with odorant molecules in the nose, to initiate a neuronal response that triggers the perception of a smell. The olfactory receptor proteins are members of a large family of G-protein-coupled receptors (GPCR) arising from single coding-exon genes. Olfactory receptors share a 7-transmembrane domain structure with many neurotransmitter and hormone receptors and are responsible for the recognition and G protein-mediated transduction of odorant signals. The olfactory receptor gene family is the largest in the genome. The nomenclature assigned to the olfactory receptor genes and proteins for this organism is independent of other organisms.

== See also ==
- Olfactory receptor
