= OR4D6 =

Protein-coding gene in the species Homo sapiens

Identifiers
- Aliases: OR4D6, OR11-250, olfactory receptor family 4 subfamily D member 6
- External IDs: MGI: 3031262; GeneCards: OR4D6

Gene location (Human)
Chr.	Chromosome 11 (human)
Band	11q12.1	Start	59,456,961 bp
Band	11q12.1	End	59,457,905 bp

Gene location (Mouse)
Chr.	Chromosome 19 (mouse)
Band	19|19 A	Start	12,085,080 bp
Band	19|19 A	End	12,093,261 bp
RNA expression pattern
Bgee	Human / Mouse (ortholog); Top expressed in: appendix; lactiferous gland; aorta; ascending aorta / n/a; More reference expression data
BioGPS	n/a
Gene ontology
Molecular function	G protein-coupled receptor activity; olfactory receptor activity; transmembrane signaling receptor activity; signal transducer activity
Cellular component	integral component of membrane; plasma membrane; membrane
Biological process	sensory perception of smell; detection of chemical stimulus involved in sensory perception of smell; detection of chemical stimulus involved in sensory perception; signal transduction; response to stimulus; G protein-coupled receptor signaling pathway
Sources:Amigo / QuickGO
Orthologs
Databases	NCBI: entry; OMA: entry
Species	Human	Mouse
Entrez	219983	258673
Ensembl	ENSG00000166884	ENSMUSG00000067524
UniProt	Q8NGJ1	n/a
RefSeq (mRNA)	NM_001004708	NM_146678
RefSeq (protein)	NP_001004708	n/a
Location (UCSC)	Chr 11: 59.46 – 59.46 Mb	Chr 19: 12.09 – 12.09 Mb
PubMed search
- Wikidata
View/Edit Human	View/Edit Mouse

Olfactory receptor 4D6 is a protein that in humans is encoded by the OR4D6 gene.

Olfactory receptors interact with odorant molecules in the nose, to initiate a neuronal response that triggers the perception of a smell. The olfactory receptor proteins are members of a large family of G-protein-coupled receptors (GPCR) arising from single coding-exon genes. Olfactory receptors share a 7-transmembrane domain structure with many neurotransmitter and hormone receptors and are responsible for the recognition and G protein-mediated transduction of odorant signals. The olfactory receptor gene family is the largest in the genome. The nomenclature assigned to the olfactory receptor genes and proteins for this organism is independent of other organisms.

== See also ==
- Olfactory receptor
