= OR4D10 =

Protein-coding gene in the species Homo sapiens

Identifiers
- Aliases: OR4D10, OR11-251, OR4D10P, OST711, olfactory receptor family 4 subfamily D member 10
- External IDs: MGI: 3031258; GeneCards: OR4D10

Gene location (Human)
Chr.	Chromosome 11 (human)
Band	11q12.1	Start	59,473,315 bp
Band	11q12.1	End	59,479,361 bp

Gene location (Mouse)
Chr.	Chromosome 19 (mouse)
Band	19|19 A	Start	12,035,988 bp
Band	19|19 A	End	12,040,046 bp
RNA expression pattern
Bgee	Human / Mouse (ortholog); Top expressed in: testicle / n/a; More reference expression data
BioGPS	n/a
Gene ontology
Molecular function	G protein-coupled receptor activity; olfactory receptor activity; transmembrane signaling receptor activity; signal transducer activity
Cellular component	integral component of membrane; plasma membrane; membrane
Biological process	sensory perception of smell; detection of chemical stimulus involved in sensory perception of smell; detection of chemical stimulus involved in sensory perception; signal transduction; response to stimulus; G protein-coupled receptor signaling pathway
Sources:Amigo / QuickGO
Orthologs
Databases	NCBI: entry; OMA: entry
Species	Human	Mouse
Entrez	390197	258676
Ensembl	ENSG00000254466	ENSMUSG00000067528
UniProt	Q8NGI6	Q8VFV1
RefSeq (mRNA)	NM_001004705	NM_146681
RefSeq (protein)	NP_001004705	NP_666892
Location (UCSC)	Chr 11: 59.47 – 59.48 Mb	Chr 19: 12.04 – 12.04 Mb
PubMed search
- Wikidata
View/Edit Human	View/Edit Mouse

Olfactory receptor 4D10 is a protein that in humans is encoded by the OR4D10 gene.

Olfactory receptors interact with odorant molecules in the nose, to initiate a neuronal response that triggers the perception of a smell. The olfactory receptor proteins are members of a large family of G-protein-coupled receptors (GPCR) arising from single coding-exon genes. Olfactory receptors share a 7-transmembrane domain structure with many neurotransmitter and hormone receptors and are responsible for the recognition and G protein-mediated transduction of odorant signals. The olfactory receptor gene family is the largest in the genome. The nomenclature assigned to the olfactory receptor genes and proteins for this organism is independent of other organisms.

== See also ==
- Olfactory receptor
