= OR2T1 =

Protein-coding gene in humans

Identifiers
- Aliases: OR2T1, OR1-25, olfactory receptor family 2 subfamily T member 1
- External IDs: MGI: 109304; GeneCards: OR2T1

Gene location (Human)
Chr.	Chromosome 1 (human)
Band	1q44	Start	248,403,048 bp
Band	1q44	End	248,408,020 bp

Gene location (Mouse)
Chr.	Chromosome 14 (mouse)
Band	14|14 A1	Start	8,137,972 bp
Band	14|14 A1	End	8,146,935 bp
RNA expression pattern
Bgee	Human / Mouse (ortholog); Top expressed in: brain; prefrontal cortex; cerebral cortex; multicellular organism / Top expressed in: hypothalamus; genital tubercle; spermatid; More reference expression data
BioGPS	n/a
Gene ontology
Molecular function	G protein-coupled receptor activity; olfactory receptor activity; signal transducer activity
Cellular component	integral component of membrane; plasma membrane; membrane
Biological process	sensory perception of smell; signal transduction; response to stimulus; detection of chemical stimulus involved in sensory perception of smell; G protein-coupled receptor signaling pathway
Sources:Amigo / QuickGO
Orthologs
Databases	NCBI: entry; OMA: entry
Species	Human	Mouse
Entrez	26696	18330
Ensembl	ENSG00000275244; ENSG00000273508; ENSG00000175143	ENSMUSG00000072707
UniProt	O43869	n/a
RefSeq (mRNA)	NM_030904	NM_147027
RefSeq (protein)	NP_112166	n/a
Location (UCSC)	Chr 1: 248.4 – 248.41 Mb	Chr 14: 8.14 – 8.15 Mb
PubMed search
- Wikidata
View/Edit Human	View/Edit Mouse

Olfactory receptor 2T1 is a protein that in humans is encoded by the OR2T1 gene.

Olfactory receptors interact with odorant molecules in the nose, to initiate a neuronal response that triggers the perception of a smell. The olfactory receptor proteins are members of a large family of G-protein-coupled receptors (GPCR) arising from single coding-exon genes. Olfactory receptors share a 7-transmembrane domain structure with many neurotransmitter and hormone receptors and are responsible for the recognition and G protein-mediated transduction of odorant signals. The olfactory receptor gene family is the largest in the genome. The nomenclature assigned to the olfactory receptor genes and proteins for this organism is independent of other organisms.

== See also ==
- Olfactory receptor
