= OR4C13 =

Protein-coding gene in the species Homo sapiens

Identifiers
- Aliases: OR4C13, olfactory receptor family 4 subfamily C member 13
- External IDs: MGI: 3031091; GeneCards: OR4C13

Gene location (Human)
Chr.	Chromosome 11 (human)
Band	11p11.12	Start	49,952,391 bp
Band	11p11.12	End	49,953,419 bp

Gene location (Mouse)
Chr.	Chromosome 2 (mouse)
Band	2|2 E1	Start	89,708,781 bp
Band	2|2 E1	End	89,713,370 bp
RNA expression pattern
Bgee	Human / Mouse (ortholog); Top expressed in: testicle; prefrontal cortex / n/a; More reference expression data
BioGPS	n/a
Gene ontology
Molecular function	transmembrane signaling receptor activity; G protein-coupled receptor activity; olfactory receptor activity; signal transducer activity
Cellular component	integral component of membrane; plasma membrane; membrane
Biological process	detection of chemical stimulus involved in sensory perception; detection of chemical stimulus involved in sensory perception of smell; sensory perception of smell; signal transduction; response to stimulus; G protein-coupled receptor signaling pathway
Sources:Amigo / QuickGO
Orthologs
Databases	NCBI: entry; OMA: entry
Species	Human	Mouse
Entrez	283092	258984
Ensembl	ENSG00000258817	ENSMUSG00000049057
UniProt	Q8NGP0	Q8VGP0
RefSeq (mRNA)	NM_001001955	NM_146982
RefSeq (protein)	NP_001001955	NP_667193
Location (UCSC)	Chr 11: 49.95 – 49.95 Mb	Chr 2: 89.71 – 89.71 Mb
PubMed search
- Wikidata
View/Edit Human	View/Edit Mouse

Olfactory receptor 4C13 is a protein that in humans is encoded by the OR4C13 gene.

Olfactory receptors interact with odorant molecules in the nose, to initiate a neuronal response that triggers the perception of a smell. The olfactory receptor proteins are members of a large family of G-protein-coupled receptors (GPCRs) arising from single coding-exon genes. Olfactory receptors share a 7-transmembrane domain structure with many neurotransmitter and hormone receptors and are responsible for the recognition and G protein-mediated transduction of odorant signals. The olfactory receptor gene family is the largest in the genome. The nomenclature assigned to the olfactory receptor genes and proteins for this organism is independent of other organisms.

== See also ==
- Olfactory receptor
