= OR4K1 =

Protein-coding gene in the species Homo sapiens

Identifiers
- Aliases: OR4K1, OR14-19, olfactory receptor family 4 subfamily K member 1
- External IDs: MGI: 3030562; GeneCards: OR4K1

Gene location (Human)
Chr.	Chromosome 14 (human)
Band	14q11.2	Start	19,930,917 bp
Band	14q11.2	End	19,936,757 bp

Gene location (Mouse)
Chr.	Chromosome 14 (mouse)
Band	14|14 C1	Start	50,371,215 bp
Band	14|14 C1	End	50,380,137 bp
RNA expression pattern
Bgee	Human / Mouse (ortholog); Top expressed in: gallbladder / n/a; More reference expression data
BioGPS	n/a
Gene ontology
Molecular function	transmembrane signaling receptor activity; olfactory receptor activity; signal transducer activity; G protein-coupled receptor activity
Cellular component	membrane; integral component of membrane; plasma membrane
Biological process	sensory perception of smell; detection of chemical stimulus involved in sensory perception of smell; signal transduction; response to stimulus; detection of chemical stimulus involved in sensory perception; G protein-coupled receptor signaling pathway
Sources:Amigo / QuickGO
Orthologs
Databases	NCBI: entry; OMA: entry
Species	Human	Mouse
Entrez	79544	258039
Ensembl	ENSG00000155249	ENSMUSG00000050030
UniProt	Q8NGD4	Q7TRM6
RefSeq (mRNA)	NM_001004063	NM_001011809
RefSeq (protein)	NP_001004063	NP_001011809
Location (UCSC)	Chr 14: 19.93 – 19.94 Mb	Chr 14: 50.37 – 50.38 Mb
PubMed search
- Wikidata
View/Edit Human	View/Edit Mouse

Olfactory receptor 4K1 is a protein that in humans is encoded by the OR4K1 gene.

Olfactory receptors interact with odorant molecules in the nose, to initiate a neuronal response that triggers the perception of a smell. The olfactory receptor proteins are members of a large family of G-protein-coupled receptors (GPCR) arising from single coding-exon genes. Olfactory receptors share a 7-transmembrane domain structure with many neurotransmitter and hormone receptors and are responsible for the recognition and G protein-mediated transduction of odorant signals. The olfactory receptor gene family is the largest in the genome. The nomenclature assigned to the olfactory receptor genes and proteins for this organism is independent of other organisms.

== See also ==
- Olfactory receptor
