= OR1J4 =

Protein-coding gene in the species Homo sapiens

Identifiers
- Aliases: OR1J4, HSHTPCRX01, HTPCRX01, OR9-21, olfactory receptor family 1 subfamily J member 4
- External IDs: MGI: 3030184; GeneCards: OR1J4

Gene location (Human)
Chr.	Chromosome 9 (human)
Band	9q33.2	Start	122,519,141 bp
Band	9q33.2	End	122,520,082 bp

Gene location (Mouse)
Chr.	Chromosome 2 (mouse)
Band	2|2 B	Start	36,736,322 bp
Band	2|2 B	End	36,741,714 bp
RNA expression pattern
Bgee	Human / Mouse (ortholog); Top expressed in: endometrium; gallbladder; rectum; islet of Langerhans / n/a; More reference expression data
BioGPS	n/a
Gene ontology
Molecular function	G protein-coupled receptor activity; olfactory receptor activity; signal transducer activity
Cellular component	integral component of membrane; plasma membrane; membrane
Biological process	sensory perception of smell; signal transduction; response to stimulus; detection of chemical stimulus involved in sensory perception of smell; G protein-coupled receptor signaling pathway
Sources:Amigo / QuickGO
Orthologs
Databases	NCBI: entry; OMA: entry
Species	Human	Mouse
Entrez	26219	258620
Ensembl	ENSG00000239590	ENSMUSG00000050015
UniProt	Q8NGS1	Q8VFP8
RefSeq (mRNA)	NM_001004452	NM_146627
RefSeq (protein)	NP_001004452	NP_666838
Location (UCSC)	Chr 9: 122.52 – 122.52 Mb	Chr 2: 36.74 – 36.74 Mb
PubMed search
- Wikidata
View/Edit Human	View/Edit Mouse

Olfactory receptor 1J4 is a protein that in humans is encoded by the OR1J4 gene.

Olfactory receptors interact with odorant molecules in the nose, to initiate a neuronal response that triggers the perception of a smell. The olfactory receptor proteins are members of a large family of G-protein-coupled receptors (GPCR) arising from single coding-exon genes. Olfactory receptors share a 7-transmembrane domain structure with many neurotransmitter and hormone receptors and are responsible for the recognition and G protein-mediated transduction of odorant signals. The olfactory receptor gene family is the largest in the genome. The nomenclature assigned to the olfactory receptor genes and proteins for this organism is independent of other organisms.

== See also ==
- Olfactory receptor
