= OR4C15 =

Protein-coding gene in the species Homo sapiens

Identifiers
- Aliases: OR4C15, OR11-127, OR11-134, olfactory receptor family 4 subfamily C member 15
- External IDs: MGI: 3031045; GeneCards: OR4C15

Gene location (Human)
Chr.	Chromosome 11 (human)
Band	11q11	Start	55,554,307 bp
Band	11q11	End	55,555,419 bp

Gene location (Mouse)
Chr.	Chromosome 2 (mouse)
Band	2|2 E1	Start	88,757,220 bp
Band	2|2 E1	End	88,768,455 bp
RNA expression pattern
Bgee	Human / Mouse (ortholog); Top expressed in: gonad / n/a; More reference expression data
BioGPS	n/a
Gene ontology
Molecular function	transmembrane signaling receptor activity; signal transducer activity; olfactory receptor activity; G protein-coupled receptor activity
Cellular component	plasma membrane; membrane; integral component of membrane
Biological process	sensory perception of smell; signal transduction; detection of chemical stimulus involved in sensory perception of smell; response to stimulus; detection of chemical stimulus involved in sensory perception; G protein-coupled receptor signaling pathway
Sources:Amigo / QuickGO
Orthologs
Databases	NCBI: entry; OMA: entry
Species	Human	Mouse
Entrez	81309	258025
Ensembl	ENSG00000181939	ENSMUSG00000075112
UniProt	Q8NGM1	Q7TR09
RefSeq (mRNA)	NM_001001920	NM_001011804
RefSeq (protein)	NP_001001920	NP_001011804
Location (UCSC)	Chr 11: 55.55 – 55.56 Mb	Chr 2: 88.76 – 88.77 Mb
PubMed search
- Wikidata
View/Edit Human	View/Edit Mouse

Olfactory receptor 4C15 is a protein that in humans is encoded by the OR4C15 gene.

Olfactory receptors interact with odorant molecules in the nose, to initiate a neuronal response that triggers the perception of a smell. The olfactory receptor proteins are members of a large family of G-protein-coupled receptors (GPCR) arising from single coding-exon genes. Olfactory receptors share a 7-transmembrane domain structure with many neurotransmitter and hormone receptors and are responsible for the recognition and G protein-mediated transduction of odorant signals. The olfactory receptor gene family is the largest in the genome. The nomenclature assigned to the olfactory receptor genes and proteins for this organism is independent of other organisms.

== See also ==
- Olfactory receptor
