= OR4A16 =

Protein-coding gene in the species Homo sapiens

Identifiers
- Aliases: OR4A16, OR11-117, OR4A16Q, olfactory receptor family 4 subfamily A member 16
- External IDs: MGI: 3031074; GeneCards: OR4A16

Gene location (Human)
Chr.	Chromosome 11 (human)
Band	11q11	Start	55,343,201 bp
Band	11q11	End	55,344,187 bp

Gene location (Mouse)
Chr.	Chromosome 2 (mouse)
Band	2|2 E1	Start	89,266,640 bp
Band	2|2 E1	End	89,273,344 bp
RNA expression pattern
Bgee	Human / Mouse (ortholog); Top expressed in: testicle / n/a; More reference expression data
BioGPS	n/a
Gene ontology
Molecular function	G protein-coupled receptor activity; olfactory receptor activity; transmembrane signaling receptor activity; signal transducer activity
Cellular component	integral component of membrane; plasma membrane; membrane
Biological process	sensory perception of smell; detection of chemical stimulus involved in sensory perception of smell; detection of chemical stimulus involved in sensory perception; signal transduction; response to stimulus; G protein-coupled receptor signaling pathway
Sources:Amigo / QuickGO
Orthologs
Databases	NCBI: entry; OMA: entry
Species	Human	Mouse
Entrez	81327	258804
Ensembl	ENSG00000181961	ENSMUSG00000111174
UniProt	Q8NH70	Q8VG73
RefSeq (mRNA)	NM_001005274	NM_146808
RefSeq (protein)	NP_001005274	NP_667019
Location (UCSC)	Chr 11: 55.34 – 55.34 Mb	Chr 2: 89.27 – 89.27 Mb
PubMed search
- Wikidata
View/Edit Human	View/Edit Mouse

Olfactory receptor 4A16 is a protein that in humans is encoded by the OR4A16 gene.

Olfactory receptors interact with odorant molecules in the nose, to initiate a neuronal response that triggers the perception of a smell. The olfactory receptor proteins are members of a large family of G-protein-coupled receptors (GPCR) arising from single coding-exon genes. Olfactory receptors share a 7-transmembrane domain structure with many neurotransmitter and hormone receptors and are responsible for the recognition and G protein-mediated transduction of odorant signals. The olfactory receptor gene family is the largest in the genome. The nomenclature assigned to the olfactory receptor genes and proteins for this organism is independent of other organisms.

== See also ==
- Olfactory receptor
