= OR1N2 =

Protein-coding gene in the species Homo sapiens

Identifiers
- Aliases: OR1N2, OR9-23, olfactory receptor family 1 subfamily N member 2
- External IDs: MGI: 3030188; GeneCards: OR1N2

Gene location (Human)
Chr.	Chromosome 9 (human)
Band	9q33.2	Start	122,553,112 bp
Band	9q33.2	End	122,555,173 bp

Gene location (Mouse)
Chr.	Chromosome 2 (mouse)
Band	2|2 B	Start	36,795,692 bp
Band	2|2 B	End	36,806,050 bp
RNA expression pattern
Bgee	Human / Mouse (ortholog); Top expressed in: testicle / n/a; More reference expression data
BioGPS	n/a
Gene ontology
Molecular function	G protein-coupled receptor activity; olfactory receptor activity; transmembrane signaling receptor activity; signal transducer activity
Cellular component	integral component of membrane; plasma membrane; membrane
Biological process	sensory perception of smell; detection of chemical stimulus involved in sensory perception of smell; detection of chemical stimulus involved in sensory perception; signal transduction; response to stimulus; G protein-coupled receptor signaling pathway
Sources:Amigo / QuickGO
Orthologs
Databases	NCBI: entry; OMA: entry
Species	Human	Mouse
Entrez	138882	258941
Ensembl	ENSG00000171501	ENSMUSG00000055088
UniProt	Q8NGR9	Q8VGJ8
RefSeq (mRNA)	NM_001004457	NM_146939
RefSeq (protein)	NP_001004457	NP_667150
Location (UCSC)	Chr 9: 122.55 – 122.56 Mb	Chr 2: 36.8 – 36.81 Mb
PubMed search
- Wikidata
View/Edit Human	View/Edit Mouse

Olfactory receptor 1N2 is a protein that in humans is encoded by the OR1N2 gene.

Olfactory receptors interact with odorant molecules in the nose, to initiate a neuronal response that triggers the perception of a smell. The olfactory receptor proteins are members of a large family of G-protein-coupled receptors (GPCR) arising from single coding-exon genes. Olfactory receptors share a 7-transmembrane domain structure with many neurotransmitter and hormone receptors and are responsible for the recognition and G protein-mediated transduction of odorant signals. The olfactory receptor gene family is the largest in the genome. The nomenclature assigned to the olfactory receptor genes and proteins for this organism is independent of other organisms.

== See also ==
- Olfactory receptor
