= OR4K2 =

Protein-coding gene in the species Homo sapiens

Identifiers
- Aliases: OR4K2, OR14-15, olfactory receptor family 4 subfamily K member 2
- External IDs: MGI: 3030564; GeneCards: OR4K2

Gene location (Human)
Chr.	Chromosome 14 (human)
Band	14q11.2	Start	19,875,142 bp
Band	14q11.2	End	19,883,932 bp

Gene location (Mouse)
Chr.	Chromosome 14 (mouse)
Band	14|14 C1	Start	50,420,753 bp
Band	14|14 C1	End	50,425,655 bp
RNA expression pattern
Bgee	Human / Mouse (ortholog); Top expressed in: testicle; cervix / n/a; More reference expression data
BioGPS	n/a
Gene ontology
Molecular function	G protein-coupled receptor activity; olfactory receptor activity; transmembrane signaling receptor activity; signal transducer activity
Cellular component	integral component of membrane; plasma membrane; membrane
Biological process	sensory perception of smell; detection of chemical stimulus involved in sensory perception of smell; detection of chemical stimulus involved in sensory perception; signal transduction; response to stimulus; G protein-coupled receptor signaling pathway
Sources:Amigo / QuickGO
Orthologs
Databases	NCBI: entry; OMA: entry
Species	Human	Mouse
Entrez	390431	258486
Ensembl	ENSG00000165762	ENSMUSG00000109835
UniProt	Q8NGD2	n/a
RefSeq (mRNA)	NM_001005501	NM_146493
RefSeq (protein)	NP_001005501	n/a
Location (UCSC)	Chr 14: 19.88 – 19.88 Mb	Chr 14: 50.42 – 50.43 Mb
PubMed search
- Wikidata
View/Edit Human	View/Edit Mouse

Olfactory receptor 4K2 is a protein that in humans is encoded by the OR4K2 gene.

Olfactory receptors interact with odorant molecules in the nose, to initiate a neuronal response that triggers the perception of a smell. The olfactory receptor proteins are members of a large family of G-protein-coupled receptors (GPCR) arising from single coding-exon genes. Olfactory receptors share a 7-transmembrane domain structure with many neurotransmitter and hormone receptors and are responsible for the recognition and G protein-mediated transduction of odorant signals. The olfactory receptor gene family is the largest in the genome. The nomenclature assigned to the olfactory receptor genes and proteins for this organism is independent of other organisms.

== See also ==
- Olfactory receptor
