= OR2A14 =

Protein-coding gene in the species Homo sapiens

Identifiers
- Aliases: OR2A14, OR2A14P, OR2A6, OST182, olfactory receptor family 2 subfamily A member 14
- External IDs: MGI: 3030278; GeneCards: OR2A14

Gene location (Human)
Chr.	Chromosome 7 (human)
Band	7q35	Start	144,123,176 bp
Band	7q35	End	144,131,188 bp

Gene location (Mouse)
Chr.	Chromosome 6 (mouse)
Band	6|6 B2.1	Start	42,926,001 bp
Band	6|6 B2.1	End	42,933,698 bp
RNA expression pattern
Bgee	Human / Mouse (ortholog); Top expressed in: gonad; testicle; canal of the cervix / n/a; More reference expression data
BioGPS	n/a
Gene ontology
Molecular function	signal transducer activity; olfactory receptor activity; G protein-coupled receptor activity
Cellular component	plasma membrane; membrane; integral component of membrane
Biological process	sensory perception of smell; signal transduction; response to stimulus; detection of chemical stimulus involved in sensory perception of smell; G protein-coupled receptor signaling pathway
Sources:Amigo / QuickGO
Orthologs
Databases	NCBI: entry; OMA: entry
Species	Human	Mouse
Entrez	135941	258650
Ensembl	ENSG00000221938; ENSG00000284891	ENSMUSG00000073110
UniProt	Q96R47	Q8VFS6
RefSeq (mRNA)	NM_001001659	NM_146656
RefSeq (protein)	NP_001001659	NP_666867
Location (UCSC)	Chr 7: 144.12 – 144.13 Mb	Chr 6: 42.93 – 42.93 Mb
PubMed search
- Wikidata
View/Edit Human	View/Edit Mouse

Olfactory receptor 2A14 is a protein that in humans is encoded by the OR2A14 gene.

Olfactory receptors interact with odorant molecules in the nose, to initiate a neuronal response that triggers the perception of a smell. The olfactory receptor proteins are members of a large family of G-protein-coupled receptors (GPCR) arising from single coding-exon genes. Olfactory receptors share a 7-transmembrane domain structure with many neurotransmitter and hormone receptors and are responsible for the recognition and G protein-mediated transduction of odorant signals. The olfactory receptor gene family is the largest in the genome. The nomenclature assigned to the olfactory receptor genes and proteins for this organism is independent of other organisms.

== See also ==
- Olfactory receptor
