= OR4A5 =

Protein-coding gene in the species Homo sapiens

Identifiers
- Aliases: OR4A5, OR11-111, olfactory receptor family 4 subfamily A member 5
- External IDs: MGI: 3031072; GeneCards: OR4A5

Gene location (Human)
Chr.	Chromosome 11 (human)
Band	11q11	Start	54,706,832 bp
Band	11q11	End	54,707,902 bp

Gene location (Mouse)
Chr.	Chromosome 2 (mouse)
Band	2|2 E1	Start	89,232,335 bp
Band	2|2 E1	End	89,240,020 bp
RNA expression pattern
Bgee	Human / Mouse (ortholog); Top expressed in: multicellular organism / n/a; More reference expression data
BioGPS	n/a
Gene ontology
Molecular function	G protein-coupled receptor activity; olfactory receptor activity; transmembrane signaling receptor activity; signal transducer activity
Cellular component	integral component of membrane; plasma membrane; membrane
Biological process	sensory perception of smell; detection of chemical stimulus involved in sensory perception of smell; detection of chemical stimulus involved in sensory perception; signal transduction; response to stimulus; G protein-coupled receptor signaling pathway
Sources:Amigo / QuickGO
Orthologs
Databases	NCBI: entry; OMA: entry
Species	Human	Mouse
Entrez	81318	258786
Ensembl	ENSG00000221840	ENSMUSG00000111517
UniProt	Q8NH83	Q8VG59
RefSeq (mRNA)	NM_001005272	NM_146790
RefSeq (protein)	NP_001005272	NP_667001
Location (UCSC)	Chr 11: 54.71 – 54.71 Mb	Chr 2: 89.23 – 89.24 Mb
PubMed search
- Wikidata
View/Edit Human	View/Edit Mouse

Olfactory receptor 4A5 is a protein that in humans is encoded by the OR4A5 gene.

Olfactory receptors interact with odorant molecules in the nose, to initiate a neuronal response that triggers the perception of a smell. The olfactory receptor proteins are members of a large family of G-protein-coupled receptors (GPCR) arising from single coding-exon genes. Olfactory receptors share a 7-transmembrane domain structure with many neurotransmitter and hormone receptors and are responsible for the recognition and G protein-mediated transduction of odorant signals. The olfactory receptor gene family is the largest in the genome. The nomenclature assigned to the olfactory receptor genes and proteins for this organism is independent of other organisms.

== See also ==
- Olfactory receptor
