= OR1L6 =

Protein-coding gene in the species Homo sapiens

Identifiers
- Aliases: OR1L6, HG16, OR1L7, OR9-30, OR1K1, olfactory receptor family 1 subfamily L member 6
- External IDs: MGI: 3030199; GeneCards: OR1L6

Gene location (Human)
Chr.	Chromosome 9 (human)
Band	9q33.2	Start	122,742,303 bp
Band	9q33.2	End	122,750,783 bp

Gene location (Mouse)
Chr.	Chromosome 2 (mouse)
Band	2|2 B	Start	37,078,210 bp
Band	2|2 B	End	37,096,031 bp
RNA expression pattern
Bgee	Human / Mouse (ortholog); Top expressed in: sural nerve; Achilles tendon / n/a; More reference expression data
BioGPS	n/a
Gene ontology
Molecular function	signal transducer activity; G protein-coupled receptor activity; olfactory receptor activity
Cellular component	plasma membrane; membrane; integral component of membrane
Biological process	sensory perception of smell; signal transduction; detection of chemical stimulus involved in sensory perception of smell; response to stimulus; G protein-coupled receptor signaling pathway
Sources:Amigo / QuickGO
Orthologs
Databases	NCBI: entry; OMA: entry
Species	Human	Mouse
Entrez	392390	258656
Ensembl	ENSG00000171459	ENSMUSG00000059429
UniProt	Q8NGR2	Q8VFT2
RefSeq (mRNA)	NM_001004453	NM_146662
RefSeq (protein)	NP_001004453	NP_666873
Location (UCSC)	Chr 9: 122.74 – 122.75 Mb	Chr 2: 37.08 – 37.1 Mb
PubMed search
- Wikidata
View/Edit Human	View/Edit Mouse

Olfactory receptor 1L6 is a protein that in humans is encoded by the OR1L6 gene.

Olfactory receptors interact with odorant molecules in the nose, to initiate a neuronal response that triggers the perception of a smell. The olfactory receptor proteins are members of a large family of G-protein-coupled receptors (GPCR) arising from single coding-exon genes. Olfactory receptors share a 7-transmembrane domain structure with many neurotransmitter and hormone receptors and are responsible for the recognition and G protein-mediated transduction of odorant signals. The olfactory receptor gene family is the largest in the genome. The nomenclature assigned to the olfactory receptor genes and proteins for this organism is independent of other organisms.

== See also ==
- Olfactory receptor
