= OR2Y1 =

Protein-coding gene in the species Homo sapiens

Identifiers
- Aliases: OR2Y1, OR5-2, olfactory receptor family 2 subfamily Y member 1
- External IDs: MGI: 3031220; GeneCards: OR2Y1

Gene location (Human)
Chr.	Chromosome 5 (human)
Band	5q35.3	Start	180,739,123 bp
Band	5q35.3	End	180,740,058 bp

Gene location (Mouse)
Chr.	Chromosome 11 (mouse)
Band	11|11 B1.2	Start	49,355,873 bp
Band	11|11 B1.2	End	49,362,542 bp
RNA expression pattern
Bgee	Human / Mouse (ortholog); Top expressed in: salivary gland; multicellular organism / n/a; More reference expression data
BioGPS	n/a
Gene ontology
Molecular function	G protein-coupled receptor activity; olfactory receptor activity; signal transducer activity
Cellular component	integral component of membrane; plasma membrane; membrane
Biological process	sensory perception of smell; signal transduction; response to stimulus; detection of chemical stimulus involved in sensory perception of smell; G protein-coupled receptor signaling pathway
Sources:Amigo / QuickGO
Orthologs
Databases	NCBI: entry; OMA: entry
Species	Human	Mouse
Entrez	134083	257888
Ensembl	ENSG00000174339	ENSMUSG00000108167
UniProt	Q8NGV0	Q7TQT0
RefSeq (mRNA)	NM_001001657	NM_001011741
RefSeq (protein)	NP_001001657	NP_001011741
Location (UCSC)	Chr 5: 180.74 – 180.74 Mb	Chr 11: 49.36 – 49.36 Mb
PubMed search
- Wikidata
View/Edit Human	View/Edit Mouse

Olfactory receptor 2Y1 is a protein that in humans is encoded by the OR2Y1 gene.

Olfactory receptors interact with odorant molecules in the nose, to initiate a neuronal response that triggers the perception of a smell. The olfactory receptor proteins are members of a large family of G-protein-coupled receptors (GPCR) arising from single coding-exon genes. Olfactory receptors share a 7-transmembrane domain structure with many neurotransmitter and hormone receptors and are responsible for the recognition and G protein-mediated transduction of odorant signals. The olfactory receptor gene family is the largest in the genome. The nomenclature assigned to the olfactory receptor genes and proteins for this organism is independent of other organisms.

== See also ==
- Olfactory receptor
