= NKAIN1 =

Protein-coding gene in humans

Identifiers
- Aliases: NKAIN1, FAM77C, Na+/K+ transporting ATPase interacting 1, Sodium/potassium transporting ATPase interacting 1
- External IDs: OMIM: 612871; MGI: 1914399; GeneCards: NKAIN1

Gene location (Human)
Chr.	Chromosome 1 (human)
Band	1p35.2	Start	31,179,745 bp
Band	1p35.2	End	31,239,887 bp

Gene location (Mouse)
Chr.	Chromosome 4 (mouse)
Band	4|4 D2.2	Start	130,297,197 bp
Band	4|4 D2.2	End	130,339,644 bp
RNA expression pattern
Bgee	Human / Mouse (ortholog); Top expressed in: ganglionic eminence; cerebellar hemisphere; right hemisphere of cerebellum; ventricular zone; muscle of thigh; gonad; gastrocnemius muscle; right adrenal cortex; left adrenal cortex; testicle / Top expressed in: tail of embryo; genital tubercle; ventricular zone; zygote; muscle of thigh; lumbar subsegment of spinal cord; ganglionic eminence; cerebellar cortex; visual cortex; primary visual cortex; More reference expression data
BioGPS	n/a
Gene ontology
Molecular function	ATPase binding
Cellular component	membrane; integral component of membrane; plasma membrane
Biological process	regulation of sodium ion transport
Sources:Amigo / QuickGO
Orthologs
Databases	NCBI: entry; OMA: entry
Species	Human	Mouse
Entrez	79570	67149
Ensembl	ENSG00000084628	ENSMUSG00000078532
UniProt	Q4KMZ8	Q9D035
RefSeq (mRNA)	NM_024522	NM_025998
RefSeq (protein)	NP_078798	NP_080274
Location (UCSC)	Chr 1: 31.18 – 31.24 Mb	Chr 4: 130.3 – 130.34 Mb
PubMed search
- Wikidata
View/Edit Human	View/Edit Mouse

Sodium/potassium transporting ATPase interacting 1 is a protein that in humans is encoded by the NKAIN1 gene.

== Function ==
NKAIN1 is a member of a family of mammalian proteins with similarity to Drosophila Nkain and interacts with the beta subunit of Na,K-ATPase (ATP1B1; MIM 182330) (Gorokhova et al., 2007 [PubMed 17606467]).[supplied by OMIM, Jun 2009].
