= OR2F2 =

Protein-coding gene in the species Homo sapiens

Identifiers
- Aliases: OR2F2, OR7-1, olfactory receptor family 2 subfamily F member 2
- External IDs: MGI: 3030286; GeneCards: OR2F2

Gene location (Human)
Chr.	Chromosome 7 (human)
Band	7q35	Start	143,935,233 bp
Band	7q35	End	143,936,186 bp

Gene location (Mouse)
Chr.	Chromosome 6 (mouse)
Band	6|6 B2.1	Start	42,762,027 bp
Band	6|6 B2.1	End	42,768,553 bp
RNA expression pattern
Bgee	Human / Mouse (ortholog); Top expressed in: ganglionic eminence / n/a; More reference expression data
BioGPS	n/a
Gene ontology
Molecular function	G protein-coupled receptor activity; olfactory receptor activity; signal transducer activity
Cellular component	integral component of membrane; plasma membrane; membrane
Biological process	sensory perception of smell; signal transduction; response to stimulus; detection of chemical stimulus involved in sensory perception of smell; G protein-coupled receptor signaling pathway
Sources:Amigo / QuickGO
Orthologs
Databases	NCBI: entry; OMA: entry
Species	Human	Mouse
Entrez	135948	258207
Ensembl	ENSG00000221910; ENSG00000284965	ENSMUSG00000094192
UniProt	O95006	Q7TRV8
RefSeq (mRNA)	NM_001004685	NM_001011869
RefSeq (protein)	NP_001004685	NP_001011869
Location (UCSC)	Chr 7: 143.94 – 143.94 Mb	Chr 6: 42.76 – 42.77 Mb
PubMed search
- Wikidata
View/Edit Human	View/Edit Mouse

Olfactory receptor 2F2 is a protein that in humans is encoded by the OR2F2 gene.

Olfactory receptors interact with odorant molecules in the nose, to initiate a neuronal response that triggers the perception of a smell. The olfactory receptor proteins are members of a large family of G-protein-coupled receptors (GPCR) arising from single coding-exon genes. Olfactory receptors share a 7-transmembrane domain structure with many neurotransmitter and hormone receptors and are responsible for the recognition and G protein-mediated transduction of odorant signals. The olfactory receptor gene family is the largest in the genome. The nomenclature assigned to the olfactory receptor genes and proteins for this organism is independent of other organisms.

== See also ==
- Olfactory receptor
