= METRNL =

Mammalian protein found in humans

Identifiers
- Aliases: METRNL, meteorin like, glial cell differentiation regulator
- External IDs: OMIM: 616241; MGI: 2384806; GeneCards: METRNL

Gene location (Human)
Chr.	Chromosome 17 (human)
Band	17q25.3	Start	83,079,609 bp
Band	17q25.3	End	83,095,122 bp

Gene location (Mouse)
Chr.	Chromosome 11 (mouse)
Band	11|11 E2	Start	121,592,370 bp
Band	11|11 E2	End	121,607,132 bp
RNA expression pattern
Bgee	Human / Mouse (ortholog); Top expressed in: skin of leg; skin of abdomen; mucosa of transverse colon; ectocervix; subcutaneous adipose tissue; ascending aorta; tibial nerve; vagina; left coronary artery; apex of heart / Top expressed in: lip; epithelium of lens; calvaria; esophagus; intestinal villus; sciatic nerve; molar; long bone; right kidney; body of femur; More reference expression data
BioGPS	n/a
Gene ontology
Molecular function	hormone activity; molecular function
Cellular component	extracellular region; extracellular exosome; extracellular space
Biological process	response to cold; negative regulation of inflammatory response; response to muscle activity; fat cell differentiation; positive regulation of brown fat cell differentiation; brown fat cell differentiation; regulation of signaling receptor activity; energy homeostasis; signal transduction
Sources:Amigo / QuickGO
Orthologs
Databases	NCBI: entry; OMA: entry
Species	Human	Mouse
Entrez	284207	210029
Ensembl	ENSG00000176845; ENSG00000275031	ENSMUSG00000039208
UniProt	Q641Q3	Q8VE43
RefSeq (mRNA)	NM_001004431; NM_001363853	NM_144797
RefSeq (protein)	NP_001004431; NP_001350782	NP_659046
Location (UCSC)	Chr 17: 83.08 – 83.1 Mb	Chr 11: 121.59 – 121.61 Mb
PubMed search
- Wikidata
View/Edit Human	View/Edit Mouse

Meteorin-like/Meteorin-Beta (Metrnl)/IL-41, also known as subfatin and cometin, is a small (~27kDa) secreted cytokine, protein encoded by a gene called meteorin-like (METRNL).

Lower serum levels of Metrnl might be a risk factor for developing coronary artery disease and type 2 diabetes mellitus
