= OR1S1 =

Protein-coding gene in the species Homo sapiens

Identifiers
- Aliases: OR1S1, OR11-232, OST034, olfactory receptor family 1 subfamily S member 1 (gene/pseudogene), olfactory receptor family 1 subfamily S member 1
- External IDs: MGI: 3031330; GeneCards: OR1S1

Gene location (Human)
Chr.	Chromosome 11 (human)
Band	11q12.1	Start	58,212,720 bp
Band	11q12.1	End	58,216,084 bp

Gene location (Mouse)
Chr.	Chromosome 19 (mouse)
Band	19|19 A	Start	13,755,242 bp
Band	19|19 A	End	13,760,284 bp
Gene ontology
Molecular function	transmembrane signaling receptor activity; G protein-coupled receptor activity; olfactory receptor activity; signal transducer activity
Cellular component	integral component of membrane; plasma membrane; membrane
Biological process	detection of chemical stimulus involved in sensory perception; detection of chemical stimulus involved in sensory perception of smell; sensory perception of smell; signal transduction; response to stimulus; G protein-coupled receptor signaling pathway
Sources:Amigo / QuickGO
Orthologs
Databases	NCBI: entry; OMA: entry
Species	Human	Mouse
Entrez	219959	258991
Ensembl	ENSG00000280204	ENSMUSG00000048356
UniProt	Q8NH92	B9EHG2
RefSeq (mRNA)	NM_001004458	NM_146989
RefSeq (protein)	NP_001004458	NP_667200
Location (UCSC)	Chr 11: 58.21 – 58.22 Mb	Chr 19: 13.76 – 13.76 Mb
PubMed search
- Wikidata
View/Edit Human	View/Edit Mouse

Olfactory receptor 1S1 is a protein that in humans is encoded by the OR1S1 gene.

Olfactory receptors interact with odorant molecules in the nose, to initiate a neuronal response that triggers the perception of a smell. The olfactory receptor proteins are members of a large family of G-protein-coupled receptors (GPCR) arising from single coding-exon genes. Olfactory receptors share a 7-transmembrane domain structure with many neurotransmitter and hormone receptors and are responsible for the recognition and G protein-mediated transduction of odorant signals. The olfactory receptor gene family is the largest in the genome. The nomenclature assigned to the olfactory receptor genes and proteins for this organism is independent of other organisms.

== See also ==
- Olfactory receptor
