= Nuclear factor of activated t cells 2 interacting protein =

Mammalian protein found in Homo sapiens

NFATC2IP
Available structures
PDB	Ortholog search: PDBe RCSB
PDB	List of PDB id codes 2JXX, 2L76, 3RD2

Identifiers
- Aliases: NFATC2IP, ESC2, NIP45, RAD60, nuclear factor of activated T-cells 2 interacting protein, nuclear factor of activated T cells 2 interacting protein
- External IDs: OMIM: 614525; MGI: 1329015; HomoloGene: 7862; GeneCards: NFATC2IP; OMA:NFATC2IP - orthologs

Gene location (Human)
Chr.	Chromosome 16 (human)
Band	16p11.2	Start	28,950,807 bp
Band	16p11.2	End	28,967,097 bp

Gene location (Mouse)
Chr.	Chromosome 7 (mouse)
Band	7 F3|7 69.01 cM	Start	125,982,026 bp
Band	7 F3|7 69.01 cM	End	125,995,909 bp
RNA expression pattern
Bgee	Human / Mouse (ortholog); Top expressed in: trabecular bone; pylorus; visceral pleura; renal medulla; nipple; cardia; cecum; superior surface of tongue; granulocyte; buccal mucosa cell / Top expressed in: cumulus cell; spermatid; Gonadal ridge; blood; seminiferous tubule; Paneth cell; fetal liver hematopoietic progenitor cell; spermatocyte; thymus; morula; More reference expression data
BioGPS	n/a
Gene ontology
Molecular function	protein tag
Cellular component	cytoplasm; nucleus
Biological process	cytokine production; protein sumoylation; positive regulation of transcription by RNA polymerase II
Sources:Amigo / QuickGO
Orthologs
Species	Human	Mouse
Entrez	84901	18020
Ensembl	ENSG00000176953	ENSMUSG00000030722
UniProt	Q8NCF5	O09130
RefSeq (mRNA)	NM_032815	NM_010900
RefSeq (protein)	NP_116204	NP_035030
Location (UCSC)	Chr 16: 28.95 – 28.97 Mb	Chr 7: 125.98 – 126 Mb
PubMed search
- Wikidata
View/Edit Human	View/Edit Mouse

Nuclear factor of activated T cells 2 interacting protein is a protein that in humans is encoded by the NFATC2IP gene.
