= OR4C12 =

Protein-coding gene in the species Homo sapiens

Identifiers
- Aliases: OR4C12, OR11-259, olfactory receptor family 4 subfamily C member 12
- External IDs: MGI: 3031089; GeneCards: OR4C12

Gene location (Human)
Chr.	Chromosome 11 (human)
Band	11p11.12	Start	49,981,473 bp
Band	11p11.12	End	49,982,535 bp

Gene location (Mouse)
Chr.	Chromosome 2 (mouse)
Band	2|2 E1	Start	89,642,395 bp
Band	2|2 E1	End	89,648,204 bp
Gene ontology
Molecular function	G protein-coupled receptor activity; olfactory receptor activity; transmembrane signaling receptor activity; signal transducer activity
Cellular component	integral component of membrane; plasma membrane; membrane
Biological process	sensory perception of smell; detection of chemical stimulus involved in sensory perception of smell; detection of chemical stimulus involved in sensory perception; signal transduction; response to stimulus; G protein-coupled receptor signaling pathway
Sources:Amigo / QuickGO
Orthologs
Databases	NCBI: entry; OMA: entry
Species	Human	Mouse
Entrez	283093	258979
Ensembl	ENSG00000284255; ENSG00000221954	ENSMUSG00000045148
UniProt	Q96R67	n/a
RefSeq (mRNA)	NM_001005270	NM_146977
RefSeq (protein)	NP_001005270	n/a
Location (UCSC)	Chr 11: 49.98 – 49.98 Mb	Chr 2: 89.64 – 89.65 Mb
PubMed search
- Wikidata
View/Edit Human	View/Edit Mouse

Olfactory receptor 4C12 is a protein that in humans is encoded by the OR4C12 gene.

Olfactory receptors interact with odorant molecules in the nose, to initiate a neuronal response that triggers the perception of a smell. The olfactory receptor proteins are members of a large family of G-protein-coupled receptors (GPCR) arising from single coding-exon genes. Olfactory receptors share a 7-transmembrane domain structure with many neurotransmitter and hormone receptors and are responsible for the recognition and G protein-mediated transduction of odorant signals. The olfactory receptor gene family is the largest in the genome. The nomenclature assigned to the olfactory receptor genes and proteins for this organism is independent of other organisms.

== See also ==
- Olfactory receptor
