= OR2L8 =

Protein-coding gene in humans

Identifiers
- Aliases: OR2L8, olfactory receptor family 2 subfamily L member 8 (gene/pseudogene), olfactory receptor family 2 subfamily L member 8
- External IDs: MGI: 3030001; GeneCards: OR2L8

Gene location (Human)
Chr.	Chromosome 1 (human)
Band	1q44	Start	247,948,858 bp
Band	1q44	End	247,949,796 bp

Gene location (Mouse)
Chr.	Chromosome 16 (mouse)
Band	16|16 A3	Start	19,328,308 bp
Band	16|16 A3	End	19,341,016 bp
Gene ontology
Molecular function	G protein-coupled receptor activity; olfactory receptor activity; signal transducer activity; molecular function
Cellular component	integral component of membrane; plasma membrane; membrane
Biological process	sensory perception of smell; signal transduction; response to stimulus; detection of chemical stimulus involved in sensory perception of smell; G protein-coupled receptor signaling pathway; biological process
Sources:Amigo / QuickGO
Orthologs
Databases	NCBI: entry; OMA: entry
Species	Human	Mouse
Entrez	391190	258937
Ensembl	ENSG00000279263	ENSMUSG00000045341
UniProt	Q8NGY9	Q8VGJ5
RefSeq (mRNA)	NM_001001963	NM_146935
RefSeq (protein)	NP_001001963	NP_667146
Location (UCSC)	Chr 1: 247.95 – 247.95 Mb	Chr 16: 19.33 – 19.34 Mb
PubMed search
- Wikidata
View/Edit Human	View/Edit Mouse

Olfactory receptor 2L8 is a protein that in humans is encoded by the OR2L8 gene.

Olfactory receptors interact with odorant molecules in the nose, to initiate a neuronal response that triggers the perception of a smell. The olfactory receptor proteins are members of a large family of G-protein-coupled receptors (GPCR) arising from single coding-exon genes. Olfactory receptors share a 7-transmembrane domain structure with many neurotransmitter and hormone receptors and are responsible for the recognition and G protein-mediated transduction of odorant signals. The olfactory receptor gene family is the largest in the genome. The nomenclature assigned to the olfactory receptor genes and proteins for this organism is independent of other organisms.

== See also ==
- Olfactory receptor
