= MMS22L =

Protein-coding gene in the species Homo sapiens

Identifiers
- Aliases: MMS22L, C6orf167, dJ39B17.2, MMS22 like, DNA repair protein
- External IDs: OMIM: 615614; MGI: 2684980; HomoloGene: 18874; GeneCards: MMS22L; OMA:MMS22L - orthologs

Gene location (Human)
Chr.	Chromosome 6 (human)
Band	6q16.1	Start	97,142,161 bp
Band	6q16.1	End	97,283,217 bp

Gene location (Mouse)
Chr.	Chromosome 4 (mouse)
Band	4|4 A3	Start	24,496,451 bp
Band	4|4 A3	End	24,602,950 bp
RNA expression pattern
Bgee	Human / Mouse (ortholog); Top expressed in: testicle; ventricular zone; ganglionic eminence; bone marrow; bone marrow cell; gonad; corpus callosum; stromal cell of endometrium; tonsil; Achilles tendon / Top expressed in: ventricular zone; tail of embryo; medial ganglionic eminence; epiblast; secondary oocyte; zygote; genital tubercle; primary oocyte; endocardial cushion; abdominal wall; More reference expression data
BioGPS	n/a
Gene ontology
Molecular function	protein binding
Cellular component	nuclear replication fork; MCM complex; nucleus; FACT complex; nucleoplasm; cytosol
Biological process	double-strand break repair via homologous recombination; DNA repair; replication fork processing; cellular response to DNA damage stimulus
Sources:Amigo / QuickGO
Orthologs
Species	Human	Mouse
Entrez	253714	212377
Ensembl	ENSG00000146263	ENSMUSG00000045751
UniProt	Q6ZRQ5	B1AUR6
RefSeq (mRNA)	NM_198468; NM_001350599; NM_001350600	NM_199467
RefSeq (protein)	NP_940870; NP_001337528; NP_001337529	NP_955761
Location (UCSC)	Chr 6: 97.14 – 97.28 Mb	Chr 4: 24.5 – 24.6 Mb
PubMed search
- Wikidata
View/Edit Human	View/Edit Mouse

Methyl methanesulfonate-sensitivity protein 22-like also known as MMS22-like, DNA repair protein is a protein that in humans is encoded by the MMS22L gene.
