= OR2C3 =

Protein-coding gene in humans

Identifiers
- Aliases: OR2C3, OR2C4, OR2C5P, OST742, olfactory receptor family 2 subfamily C member 3
- External IDs: GeneCards: OR2C3

Gene location (Human)
Chr.	Chromosome 1 (human)
Band	1q44	Start	247,524,677 bp
Band	1q44	End	247,536,440 bp
RNA expression pattern
Bgee	Human / Mouse (ortholog); Top expressed in: gonad; ganglionic eminence; gastric mucosa; smooth muscle tissue; placenta; testicle; endometrium; right testis; gallbladder; islet of Langerhans / n/a; More reference expression data
BioGPS	n/a
Gene ontology
Molecular function	G protein-coupled receptor activity; signal transducer activity; olfactory receptor activity
Cellular component	integral component of membrane; membrane; plasma membrane
Biological process	response to stimulus; signal transduction; sensory perception of smell; detection of chemical stimulus involved in sensory perception of smell; G protein-coupled receptor signaling pathway
Sources:Amigo / QuickGO
Orthologs
Databases	NCBI: entry; OMA: entry
Species	Human	Mouse
Entrez	81472	n/a
Ensembl	ENSG00000196242	n/a
UniProt	Q8N628	n/a
RefSeq (mRNA)	NM_198074	n/a
RefSeq (protein)	NP_932340	n/a
Location (UCSC)	Chr 1: 247.52 – 247.54 Mb	n/a
PubMed search		n/a
- Wikidata
View/Edit Human

Olfactory receptor 2C3 is a protein that in humans is encoded by the OR2C3 gene.

Olfactory receptors interact with odorant molecules in the nose, to initiate a neuronal response that triggers the perception of a smell. The olfactory receptor proteins are members of a large family of G-protein-coupled receptors (GPCR) arising from single coding-exon genes. Olfactory receptors share a 7-transmembrane domain structure with many neurotransmitter and hormone receptors and are responsible for the recognition and G protein-mediated transduction of odorant signals. The olfactory receptor gene family is the largest in the genome. The nomenclature assigned to the olfactory receptor genes and proteins for this organism is independent of other organisms.

== See also ==
- Olfactory receptor
