= OR4Q3 =

Protein-coding gene in the species Homo sapiens

Identifiers
- Aliases: OR4Q3, C14orf13, HSA6, OR14-3, OR4Q4, c14_5008, olfactory receptor family 4 subfamily Q member 3
- External IDs: MGI: 3030569; GeneCards: OR4Q3

Gene location (Mouse)
Chr.	Chromosome 14 (mouse)
Band	14|14 C1	Start	50,580,069 bp
Band	14|14 C1	End	50,586,329 bp
Gene ontology
Molecular function	G protein-coupled receptor activity; olfactory receptor activity; transmembrane signaling receptor activity; signal transducer activity
Cellular component	integral component of membrane; plasma membrane; membrane
Biological process	sensory perception of smell; detection of chemical stimulus involved in sensory perception of smell; detection of chemical stimulus involved in sensory perception; signal transduction; response to stimulus; G protein-coupled receptor signaling pathway
Sources:Amigo / QuickGO
Orthologs
Databases	NCBI: entry
Species	Human	Mouse
Entrez	441669	257909
Ensembl	n/a	ENSMUSG00000046210
UniProt	Q8NH05	Q7TRM4
RefSeq (mRNA)	NM_172194; NM_001405963	NM_001011754
RefSeq (protein)	NP_751944	NP_001011754
Location (UCSC)	n/a	Chr 14: 50.58 – 50.59 Mb
PubMed search
- Wikidata
View/Edit Human	View/Edit Mouse

Olfactory receptor 4Q3 is a protein that in humans is encoded by the OR4Q3 gene.

Olfactory receptors interact with odorant molecules in the nose, to initiate a neuronal response that triggers the perception of a smell. The olfactory receptor proteins are members of a large family of G-protein-coupled receptors (GPCR) arising from single coding-exon genes. Olfactory receptors share a 7-transmembrane domain structure with many neurotransmitter and hormone receptors and are responsible for the recognition and G protein-mediated transduction of odorant signals. The olfactory receptor gene family is the largest in the genome. The nomenclature assigned to the olfactory receptor genes and proteins for this organism is independent of other organisms.

== See also ==
- Olfactory receptor
