= OR1L1 =

Protein-coding gene in the species Homo sapiens

Identifiers
- Aliases: OR1L1, HG23, OR1L2, OR9-27, OR9-C, olfactory receptor family 1 subfamily L member 1
- External IDs: GeneCards: OR1L1

Gene location (Human)
Chr.	Chromosome 9 (human)
Band	9q33.2	Start	122,661,566 bp
Band	9q33.2	End	122,662,648 bp
RNA expression pattern
Bgee	Human / Mouse (ortholog); Top expressed in: testicle; urinary bladder; right coronary artery / n/a; More reference expression data
BioGPS	n/a
Gene ontology
Molecular function	G protein-coupled receptor activity; signal transducer activity; olfactory receptor activity
Cellular component	integral component of membrane; plasma membrane; membrane
Biological process	sensory perception of smell; detection of chemical stimulus involved in sensory perception of smell; signal transduction; response to stimulus; G protein-coupled receptor signaling pathway
Sources:Amigo / QuickGO
Orthologs
Databases	NCBI: entry; OMA: entry
Species	Human	Mouse
Entrez	26737	n/a
Ensembl	ENSG00000173679	n/a
UniProt	Q8NH94	n/a
RefSeq (mRNA)	NM_001005236	n/a
RefSeq (protein)	NP_001005236	n/a
Location (UCSC)	Chr 9: 122.66 – 122.66 Mb	n/a
PubMed search		n/a
- Wikidata
View/Edit Human

Olfactory receptor 1L1 is a protein that in humans is encoded by the OR1L1 gene.

Olfactory receptors interact with odorant molecules in the nose, to initiate a neuronal response that triggers the perception of a smell. The olfactory receptor proteins are members of a large family of G-protein-coupled receptors (GPCR) arising from single coding-exon genes. Olfactory receptors share a 7-transmembrane domain structure with many neurotransmitter and hormone receptors and are responsible for the recognition and G protein-mediated transduction of odorant signals. The olfactory receptor gene family is the largest in the genome. The nomenclature assigned to the olfactory receptor genes and proteins for this organism is independent of other organisms.

== See also ==
- Olfactory receptor
