= METTL24 =

Protein-coding gene in the species Homo sapiens

Identifiers
- Aliases: METTL24, C6orf186, dJ71D21.2, methyltransferase like 24
- External IDs: MGI: 3045338; HomoloGene: 65335; GeneCards: METTL24; OMA:METTL24 - orthologs

Gene location (Human)
Chr.	Chromosome 6 (human)
Band	6q21	Start	110,243,940 bp
Band	6q21	End	110,358,349 bp

Gene location (Mouse)
Chr.	Chromosome 10 (mouse)
Band	10|10 B1	Start	40,559,278 bp
Band	10|10 B1	End	40,687,079 bp
RNA expression pattern
Bgee	Human / Mouse (ortholog); Top expressed in: smooth muscle tissue; Achilles tendon; muscle layer of sigmoid colon; popliteal artery; thoracic aorta; tibial arteries; ascending aorta; right coronary artery; Descending thoracic aorta; gallbladder / Top expressed in: embryo; morula; embryo; ovary; yolk sac; ascending aorta; dentate gyrus of hippocampal formation granule cell; lip; vestibular sensory epithelium; lung; More reference expression data
BioGPS	n/a
Gene ontology
Molecular function	methyltransferase activity; transferase activity
Cellular component	extracellular region
Biological process	methylation
Sources:Amigo / QuickGO
Orthologs
Species	Human	Mouse
Entrez	728464	327747
Ensembl	ENSG00000053328	ENSMUSG00000045555
UniProt	Q5JXM2	Q8CCB5
RefSeq (mRNA)	NM_001123364; NM_001354594; NM_001354595	NM_177793
RefSeq (protein)	NP_001116836; NP_001341523; NP_001341524	NP_808461
Location (UCSC)	Chr 6: 110.24 – 110.36 Mb	Chr 10: 40.56 – 40.69 Mb
PubMed search
- Wikidata
View/Edit Human	View/Edit Mouse

Methyltransferase like 24 is a protein that in humans is encoded by the METTL24 gene.
