= MEI1 =

Protein-coding gene in the species Homo sapiens

Identifiers
- Aliases: MEI1, SPATA38, meiotic double-stranded break formation protein 1, HYDM3
- External IDs: OMIM: 608797; MGI: 3028590; GeneCards: MEI1

Gene location (Human)
Chr.	Chromosome 22 (human)
Band	22q13.2	Start	41,699,503 bp
Band	22q13.2	End	41,799,456 bp

Gene location (Mouse)
Chr.	Chromosome 15 (mouse)
Band	15 E1|15 38.41 cM	Start	81,954,197 bp
Band	15 E1|15 38.41 cM	End	82,011,015 bp
RNA expression pattern
Bgee	Human / Mouse (ortholog); Top expressed in: bone marrow cell; right testis; granulocyte; left testis; spleen; appendix; testicle; blood; lymph node; gonad / Top expressed in: lumbar spinal ganglion; otolith organ; utricle; embryo; morula; gastrula; spermatid; superior frontal gyrus; primary visual cortex; seminiferous tubule; More reference expression data
BioGPS	n/a
Orthologs
Databases	NCBI: entry; OMA: entry
Species	Human	Mouse
Entrez	150365	74369
Ensembl	ENSG00000167077	ENSMUSG00000068117
UniProt	Q5TIA1; Q4G0I1	Q9D4I2
RefSeq (mRNA)	NM_152513	NM_028897; NM_001310435
RefSeq (protein)	NP_689726; NP_689726.3	NP_001297364; NP_083173
Location (UCSC)	Chr 22: 41.7 – 41.8 Mb	Chr 15: 81.95 – 82.01 Mb
PubMed search
- Wikidata
View/Edit Human	View/Edit Mouse

Meiotic double-stranded break formation protein 1 is a protein that in humans is encoded by the MEI1 gene.
