= Glutamine–tRNA ligase =

Class of enzymes

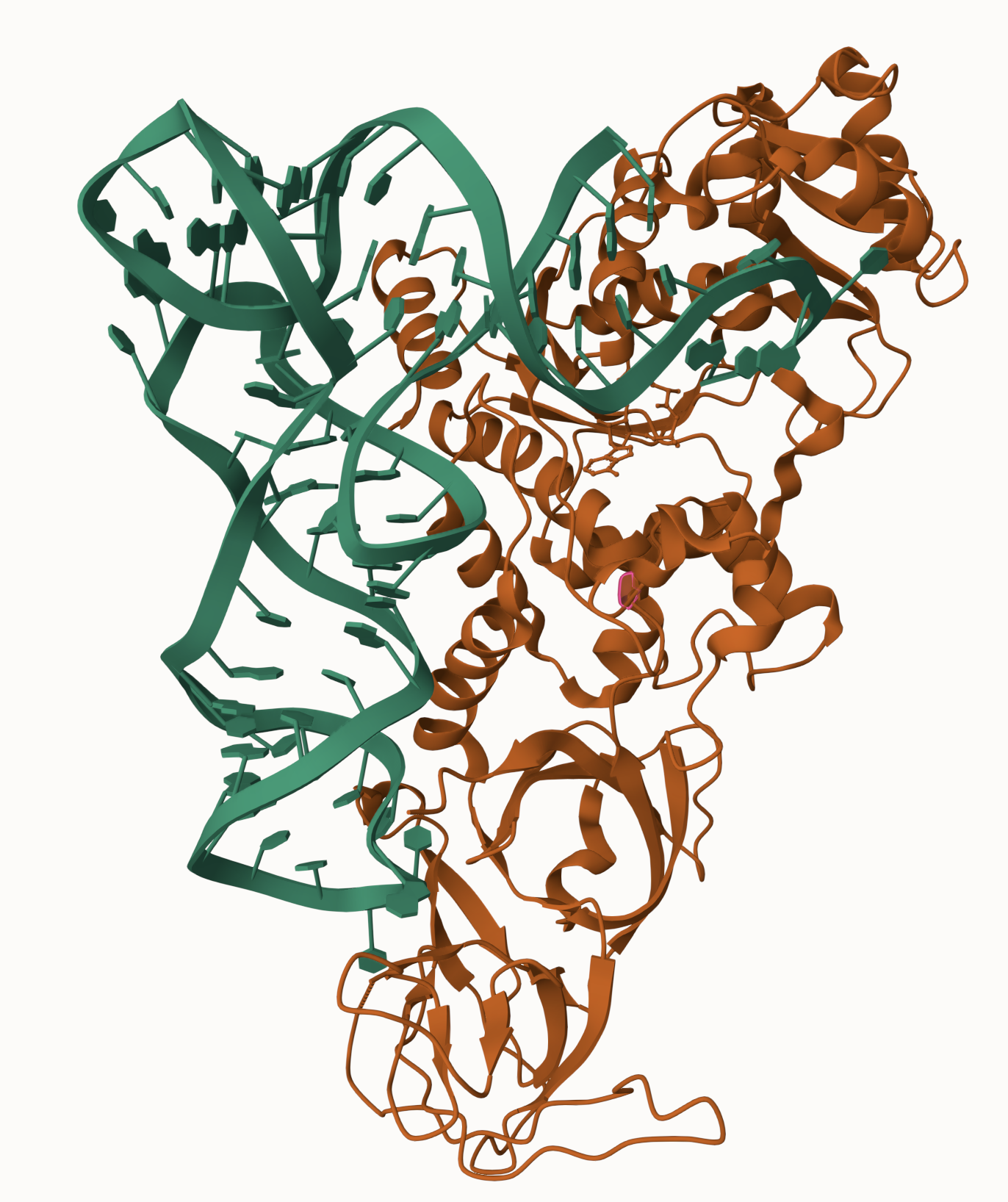
- Crystal structure of E. coli glutaminyl-tRNA synthetase complexed with a tRNA^{Gln} mutant and an active-site inhibitor (Accession number: 1EUG). The tRNA is depicted in green and the glutaminyl-tRNA synthetase is in orange.

Identifiers
- EC no.: 6.1.1.18
- CAS no.: 9075-59-6

Databases
- BRENDA: enzyme data
- ExPASy: NiceZyme view
- KEGG: enzyme entry
- MetaCyc: metabolic pathway
- Rhea: reactions
- PDB structures: RCSB PDB PDBe PDBsum
- Gene Ontology: AmiGO / QuickGO
Search
- PMC: articles
- PubMed: articles
- NCBI: proteins

Glutamine–tRNA ligase or glutaminyl-tRNA synthetase (GlnRS) is an aminoacyl-tRNA synthetase (aaRS or ARS), also called tRNA-ligase, is an enzyme that attaches the amino acid glutamine onto its cognate tRNA.

This enzyme participates in glutamate metabolism and aminoacyl-tRNA biosynthesis.

The human gene for glutaminyl-tRNA synthetase is QARS1.

== Catalyzed reaction ==
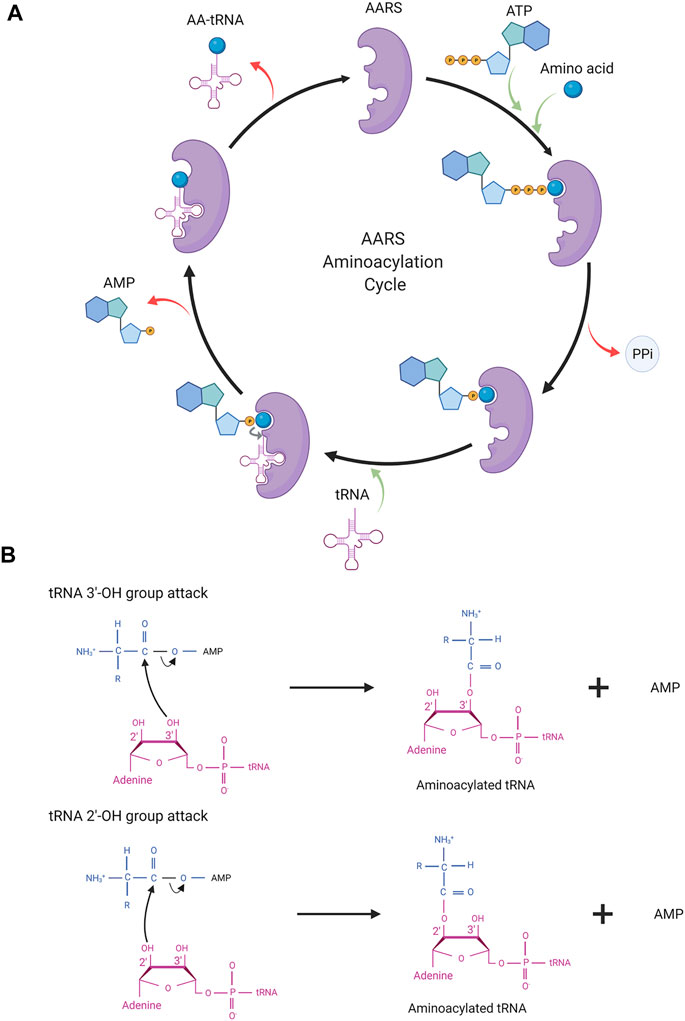
The cycle and mechanism of aminoacylation by tRNA synthetases.

Glutamine–RNA ligase (EC 6.1.1.18) is an enzyme that catalyzes the chemical reaction

ATP + L-glutamine + tRNA^{Gln} $\rightleftharpoons$ AMP + diphosphate + L-glutaminyl-tRNA^{Gln}

The 3 substrates of this enzyme are ATP, L-glutamine, and tRNA^{Gln}, whereas its 3 products are AMP, diphosphate, and L-glutaminyl-tRNA^{Gln}. The cycle of aminoacylation reaction is shown in the figure.

== Nomenclature ==
This enzyme belongs to the family of ligases, to be specific those forming carbon–oxygen bonds in aminoacyl-tRNA and related compounds. The systematic name of this enzyme class is L-glutamine:tRNA^{Gln} ligase (AMP-forming). Glutaminyl-tRNA synthetase or GlnRS is the primary name in use in the scientific literature. Other names that have been reported are:

- glutaminyl-transfer RNA synthetase,
- glutaminyl-transfer ribonucleate synthetase,
- glutamine-tRNA synthetase, and
- glutamate-tRNA ligase

== Evolution ==
In the eukaryotic cytoplasm and in some bacteria such as E. coli, glutaminyl-tRNA synthetase catalyzes glutamine-tRNA^{Gln} formation. However a two-step formation process is necessary for its formation in all archaebacteria and most eubacteria as well as most eukaryotic organelles. In these cases, a glutamyl-tRNA synthetase first mis-aminoacylates tRNA^{Gln} with glutamate. Glutamine-tRNA^{Gln} is then formed by transamidation of the misacylated glutamate-tRNA^{Gln} by the glutaminyl-tRNA synthase (glutamine-hydrolysing) enzyme. It is believed that glutaminyl-tRNA synethetases have evolved from the glutamyl-tRNA synthetase enzyme.

Aminoacyl tRNA synthetases are divided into two major classes based on their active site structure: class I and II. Glutaminyl-tRNA synthetase belongs to the class-I aminoacyl-tRNA synthetase family.

== Structure ==
Of the glutaminyl-tRNA synthetases, the enzyme from E. coli is the most well studied structurally and biochemically. It is 553 amino acids long and is about 100 Å long. At the N-terminus, it has its catalytic active site with a Rossmann dinucleotide fold interacting with the 2′ OH of the final nucleotide of tRNA^{Gln} (A76), while the C-terminus interacts with the tRNAs anti-codon loop. The human glutaminyl-tRNA synthetase structure at N-terminus contains a two tandem nonspecific RNA binding regions, a catalytic domain, and two tandem anti-codon binding domains in the C-terminus.

The first crystal structure of a tRNA synthetase in complex with its cognate tRNA was that of the E. coli tRNA-Gln:GlnRS, determined in 1989 (PDB accession code (1GSG). This was also the first crystal structure of a nonviral protein:RNA complex. The purified enzyme was crystallized in complex with in vivo overexpressed tRNA^{Gln}.

As of late 2024, over 38 structures have been solved for this class of enzymes. Some of the PDB accession codes include PDB: 1EUQ, PDB: 1EUY, PDB: 1EXD, PDB: 1GSG, PDB: 1GTR, PDB: 1GTS, PDB: 1NYL, PDB: 1O0B, PDB: 1O0C, PDB: 1QRS, PDB: 1QRT, PDB: 1QRU, PDB: 1QTQ, PDB: 1ZJW, and PDB: 2HZ7. The E. coli glutaminyl-tRNA synethetase structure complexed with its cognate tRNA, tRNA^{Gln} is depicted in the figure (accession number 1EUG.
