= Glu-AdT subunit B =

Enzyme found in humans

GATB

Identifiers
- Aliases: GATB, PET112, PET112L, HSPC199, glutamyl-tRNA(Gln) amidotransferase, subunit B, glutamyl-tRNA amidotransferase subunit B, COXPD41
- External IDs: OMIM: 603645; MGI: 2442496; GeneCards: GATB

Gene location (Human)
Chr.	Chromosome 4 (human)
Band	4q31.3	Start	151,670,504 bp
Band	4q31.3	End	151,761,007 bp

Gene location (Mouse)
Chr.	Chromosome 3 (mouse)
Band	3|3 F1	Start	85,574,119 bp
Band	3|3 F1	End	85,655,622 bp
RNA expression pattern
Bgee	Human / Mouse (ortholog); Top expressed in: C1 segment; apex of heart; right auricle of heart; left ventricle; right frontal lobe; prefrontal cortex; Brodmann area 9; cingulate gyrus; anterior cingulate cortex; muscle of thigh / Top expressed in: right kidney; interventricular septum; spermatocyte; proximal tubule; otic vesicle; human kidney; masseter muscle; myocardium of ventricle; otic placode; spermatid; More reference expression data
BioGPS	n/a
Gene ontology
Molecular function	nucleotide binding; carbon-nitrogen ligase activity, with glutamine as amido-N-donor; translation factor activity, RNA binding; ligase activity; ATP binding; glutaminyl-tRNA synthase (glutamine-hydrolyzing) activity; catalytic activity
Cellular component	mitochondrion; glutamyl-tRNA(Gln) amidotransferase complex
Biological process	protein biosynthesis; mitochondrial translation; glutaminyl-tRNAGln biosynthesis via transamidation; metabolism
Sources:Amigo / QuickGO
Orthologs
Databases	NCBI: entry; OMA: entry
Species	Human	Mouse
Entrez	5188	229487
Ensembl	ENSG00000059691	ENSMUSG00000028085
UniProt	O75879	Q99JT1
RefSeq (mRNA)	NM_004564; NM_001363341	NM_144896
RefSeq (protein)	NP_004555; NP_001350270	NP_659145; NP_001386159
Location (UCSC)	Chr 4: 151.67 – 151.76 Mb	Chr 3: 85.57 – 85.66 Mb
PubMed search
- Wikidata
View/Edit Human	View/Edit Mouse

Glutamyl-tRNA(Gln) amidotransferase subunit B, mitochondrial (Glu-AdT subunit B) is an enzyme that in humans is encoded by the GATB gene. This protein functions as the catalytic (enzyme) subunit of the protein complex Glu-tRNA^{Gln} amidotransferase (Glu-Adt) which is involved in protein synthesis in the mitochondria.

GATB together with GATA (QRSL1) and GATC form a complex called Glu-tRNA^{Gln} amidotransferase (Glu-Adt). This complex, and by extension Glu-AdT subunit B, functions to convert (mischarged) glutamyl-tRNA^{Gln} to glutaminyl-tRNA^{Gln}, which is used to incorporate glutamine into proteins during RNA-to-DNA translation.

== Background and function ==
Proteins are synthesized with the help of special adaptor molecules called transfer RNA (tRNA), which connect messenger RNA (mRNA) sequences to their corresponding amino acid. Each tRNA has a corresponding amino acid it represents, and in the case of glutamine this type of RNA is denoted tRNA^{Gln}. In order to be used in mRNA-to-protein translation, the tRNA must be first charged with (attached to) the correct amino acid, producing a molecule called am aminoacyl-tRNA.

In most cases, including for glutamine in the human cytoplasm (see QARS1), aminoacyl-tRNA are produced by directly attaching the amino acid to its corresponding tRNA using enzymes called aminoacyl tRNA synthetases. However, this is not the case of glutamine in the mitochondria (and many bacteria). Instead the amino acid glutamate is first mischarged to tRNA^{Gln} (using EARS2), and then needs to be converted into glutamine by Glu-tRNA^{Gln} amidotransferase, which in humans is a protein complex formed out of QRSL1 (GATA), GATB, and GATC.
