= WHEP-TRS protein domain =

WHEP-TRS
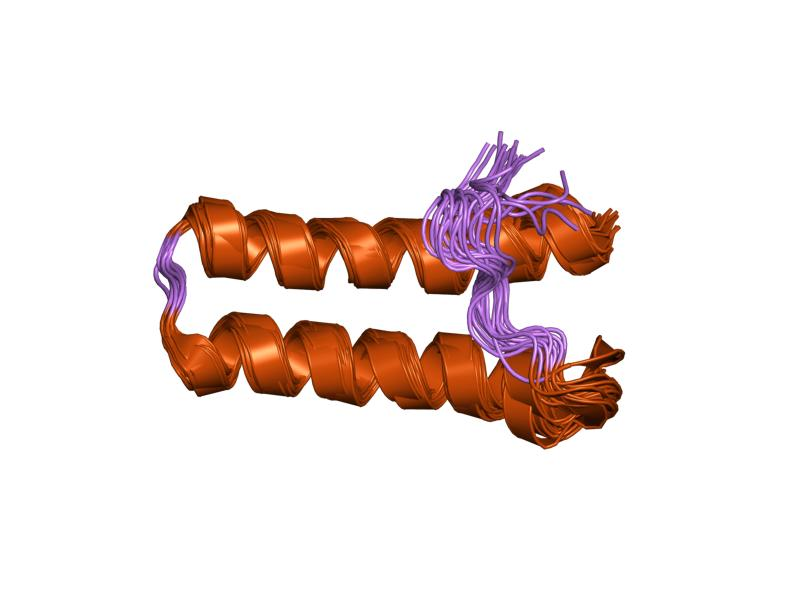
- Solution structure of multi-functional peptide motif-1 present in human glutamyl-prolyl tRNA synthetase (eprs).

Identifiers
- Symbol: WHEP-TRS
- Pfam: PF00458
- InterPro: IPR000738
- PROSITE: PDOC00614
- SCOP2: 1gtr / SCOPe / SUPFAM
Available protein structures:
- PDB: IPR000738 PF00458 (ECOD; PDBsum)
- AlphaFold: IPR000738; PF00458

In molecular biology, the protein domain WHEP-TRS refers to helix-turn-helix domains. They are found in variable numbers in glutamyl-prolyl tRNA synthetase (EPRS). This protein domain has an important function in protein–protein interactions between synthetases. WHEP domains exhibit high-affinity interactions with tRNA, indicating a putative evolutionary relationship to facilitate tRNA binding to fused synthetases, thereby enhancing catalytic efficiency.

== Protein interactions ==
EPRS is a component of the interferon-gamma-activated inhibitor of translation (GAIT) complex, which interacts with stem-loop elements (GAIT elements) in mRNAs encoding proinflammatory proteins, for example, vascular endothelial growth factor-A (VEGFA). WHEP domains interact with the GAIT element in the 3′UTR of target mRNAs and with the regulatory protein NS1-associated protein-1 (NSAP1).

== Structure ==
A conserved domain of 46 amino acids, called WHEP-TRS has been shown to exist in a number of higher eukaryote aminoacyl-transfer RNA synthetases. This domain is present one to six times in several enzymes. There are three copies in mammalian aminoacyl-tRNA synthetase in a region that separates the N-terminal glutamyl-tRNA synthetase domain from the C-terminal prolyl-tRNA synthetase domain, and six copies in the intercatalytic region of the Drosophila enzyme. The domain is found at the N-terminal extremity of the mammalian tryptophanyl- tRNA synthetase and histidyl-tRNA synthetase, and the mammalian, insect, nematode and plant glycyl- tRNA synthetases.
