= VARS1 =

Protein-coding gene in humans

Identifiers
- Aliases: VARS1, VARS, NDMSCA, valyl-tRNA synthetase 1, G7A, VARS2, valyl-tRNA synthetase
- External IDs: OMIM: 192150; MGI: 90675; GeneCards: VARS1
Enzyme activity
EC #	BRENDA	ExPASy	KEGG	MetaCyc
6.1.1.9	↗	↗	↗	↗

Gene location (Human)
Chr.	Chromosome 6 (human)
Band	6p21.33	Start	31,777,518 bp
Band	6p21.33	End	31,795,752 bp

Gene location (Mouse)
Chr.	Chromosome 17 (mouse)
Band	17 B1|17 18.54 cM	Start	35,219,963 bp
Band	17 B1|17 18.54 cM	End	35,235,298 bp
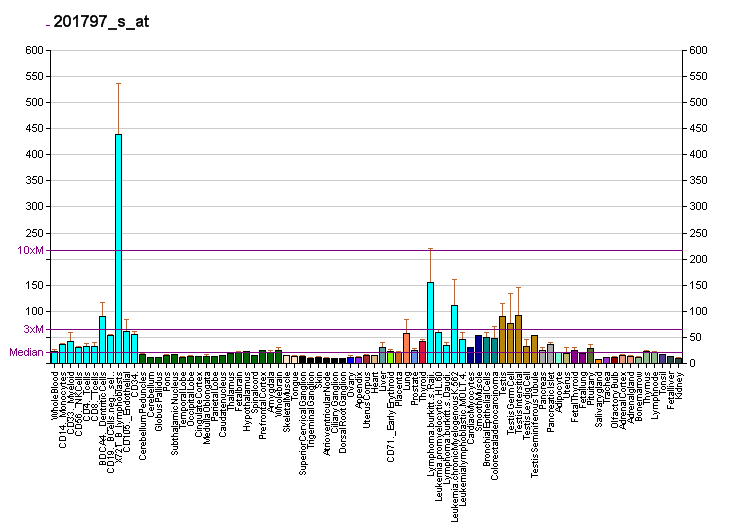

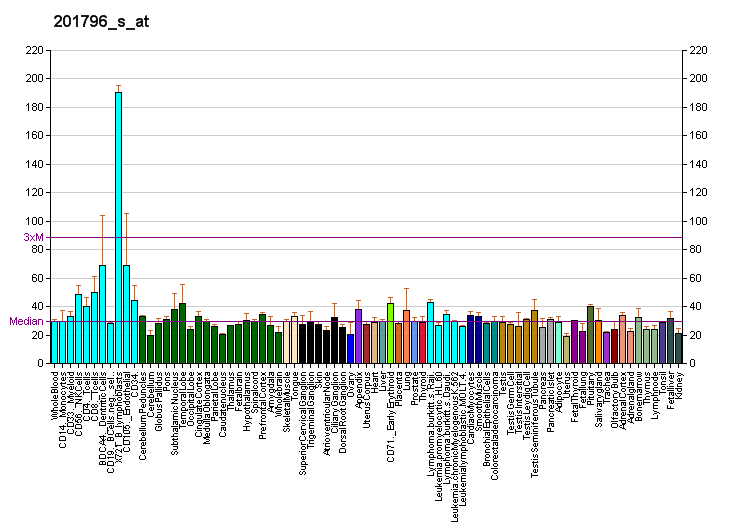
RNA expression pattern
Bgee	Human / Mouse (ortholog); Top expressed in: right testis; left testis; islet of Langerhans; pituitary gland; ganglionic eminence; appendix; anterior pituitary; stromal cell of endometrium; gastrocnemius muscle; muscle tissue / Top expressed in: spermatid; ventricular zone; tail of embryo; seminiferous tubule; epiblast; yolk sac; spermatocyte; lip; tibiofemoral joint; otic vesicle; More reference expression data
BioGPS	More reference expression data
Gene ontology
Molecular function	aminoacyl-tRNA ligase activity; nucleotide binding; ligase activity; protein binding; ATP binding; aminoacyl-tRNA editing activity; valine-tRNA ligase activity
Cellular component	cytoplasm; cytosol
Biological process	tRNA aminoacylation for protein translation; protein biosynthesis; valyl-tRNA aminoacylation; aminoacyl-tRNA metabolism involved in translational fidelity
Sources:Amigo / QuickGO
Orthologs
Databases	NCBI: entry; OMA: entry
Species	Human	Mouse
Entrez	7407	22321
Ensembl	ENSG00000226589; ENSG00000096171; ENSG00000231945; ENSG00000227686; ENSG00000204394 ENSG00000224264; ENSG00000231116	ENSMUSG00000007029
UniProt	P26640	Q9Z1Q9
RefSeq (mRNA)	NM_006295	NM_011690
RefSeq (protein)	NP_006286; NP_006286.1	NP_035820
Location (UCSC)	Chr 6: 31.78 – 31.8 Mb	Chr 17: 35.22 – 35.24 Mb
PubMed search
- Wikidata
View/Edit Human	View/Edit Mouse

Valyl-tRNA synthetase 1 is an enzyme that in humans is encoded by the VARS1 gene (previously VARS). Like VARS2, this enzyme functions as a valine–tRNA ligase.

== Function ==
Aminoacyl-tRNA synthetases catalyze the aminoacylation of tRNA by their cognate amino acid. Because of their central role in linking amino acids with nucleotide triplets contained in tRNAs, aminoacyl-tRNA synthetases are thought to be among the first proteins that appeared in evolution. The protein encoded by this gene belongs to class I aminoacyl-tRNA synthetase family and is located in the class III region of the major histocompatibility complex.

== Medical significance ==
Pathogenic (homozygous or compound heterozygous) mutations in VARS1 are associated with an unusually small head and brain (microcephaly) and developmental delay, called neurodevelopmental disorder with microcephaly, seizures, and cortical atrophy (NDMSCA).

== See also ==
- Valine-tRNA ligase
