= SHLD1 =

Protein-coding gene in the species Homo sapiens

Identifiers
- Aliases: SHLD1, chromosome 20 open reading frame 196, shieldin complex subunit 1, RINN3, C20orf196
- External IDs: OMIM: 618028; MGI: 1920997; GeneCards: SHLD1

Gene location (Human)
Chr.	Chromosome 20 (human)
Band	20p12.3	Start	5,750,393 bp
Band	20p12.3	End	5,864,395 bp

Gene location (Mouse)
Chr.	Chromosome 2 (mouse)
Band	2 F2|2	Start	132,528,851 bp
Band	2 F2|2	End	132,592,975 bp
RNA expression pattern
Bgee	Human / Mouse (ortholog); Top expressed in: gonad; monocyte; testicle; oocyte; gastrocnemius muscle; right adrenal gland; left adrenal cortex; right adrenal cortex; blood; lymph node / Top expressed in: interventricular septum; myocardium of ventricle; otolith organ; utricle; granulocyte; hand; blood; facial motor nucleus; blastocyst; internal carotid artery; More reference expression data
BioGPS	n/a
Gene ontology
Molecular function	protein binding
Cellular component	chromosome; site of double-strand break
Biological process	positive regulation of isotype switching; negative regulation of double-strand break repair via homologous recombination; positive regulation of double-strand break repair via nonhomologous end joining; DNA repair; cellular response to DNA damage stimulus; regulation of double-strand break repair via nonhomologous end joining
Sources:Amigo / QuickGO
Orthologs
Databases	NCBI: entry; OMA: entry
Species	Human	Mouse
Entrez	149840	73747
Ensembl	ENSG00000171984	ENSMUSG00000044991
UniProt	Q8IYI0	Q9D112
RefSeq (mRNA)	NM_001303477; NM_001303478; NM_001303479; NM_152504	NM_028637; NM_001358260; NM_001358261
RefSeq (protein)	NP_001290406; NP_001290407; NP_001290408; NP_689717	NP_082913; NP_001345189; NP_001345190
Location (UCSC)	Chr 20: 5.75 – 5.86 Mb	Chr 2: 132.53 – 132.59 Mb
PubMed search
- Wikidata
View/Edit Human	View/Edit Mouse

SHLD1 or shieldin complex subunit 1 is a gene on chromosome 20. The C20orf196 gene encodes an mRNA that is 1,763 base pairs long, and a protein that is 205 amino acids long.

== Function ==
C20orf196 is involved in the DNA repair network. Gupta et al. identified C20orf196 as part of a vertebrate-specific protein complex called shieldin. Shieldin is recruited to double stranded breaks (DSB) to promote nonhomologous end joining-dependent repair (NHEJ), immunoglobulin class-switch recombination (CSR), and fusion of unprotected telomeres. Analysis indicates a sub-stoichiometric interaction or weaker interaction affinity of SHLD1 to the shieldin complex.

== Gene ==
=== Locus ===
C20orf196 is located on the short arm of chromosome 20 at 20p12.3, from base pairs 5,750,286 to 5,864,407 on the direct strand. It contains 11 exons.

=== Aliases ===
Its aliases are RINN3 and SHLD1.

== Expression ==
=== mRNA ===
==== Alternative splicing ====
C20orf196 produces 9 different mRNAs, with 7 alternatively spliced variants and 2 unspliced forms. There are 3 probable alternative promoters, 3 non-overlapping alternative last exons, and 2 alternative polyadenylation sites. The mRNAs differ by the truncation of the 5' end, truncation of the 3' end, presence or absence of 2 cassette exons, and overlapping exons with different boundaries.

==== Isoforms ====
C20orf196 has six splice isoforms.

=== Promoter ===
The promoter region is within bases 5749286 to 5750555, totaling 1270 base pairs. The transcription start site is located within bases 5750382 and 5750409, totaling 28 base pairs.

=== Expression ===
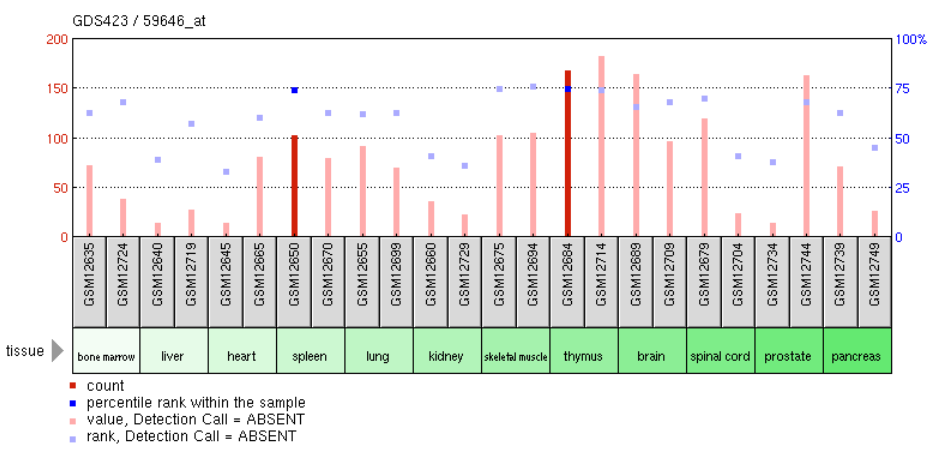
NCBI GEO Human Tissue Expression Profile for C20orf196.

RNA-Seq analysis has shown ubiquitous expression of c20orf196 in 26 human tissues: adrenal, appendix, bone marrow, brain, colon, duodenum, endometrium, esophagus, fat, gall bladder, heart, kidney, liver, lung, lymph node, ovary, pancreas, placenta, prostate, salivary gland, skin, small intestine, spleen, stomach, testis, thyroid, and urinary bladder. The highest C20orf196 mRNA levels were found in the lymph node, tonsil, thyroid, adrenal gland, prostate, pharynx, parathyroid, connective tissue, and bone marrow.

C20orf196 was found to be expressed in soft tissue/muscle tissue tumors, lymphoma tumors, and pancreatic tumors. C20orf196 representation was biased toward the fetal developmental stage. EBI expression data showed high expression of C20orf196 in the diencephalon and cerebral cortex in the developing brain.

== Protein ==
=== General features ===
The most common transcript encodes a protein that is 205 amino acids long with a molecular mass of 23 kDa. It has a predicted isoelectric point of 4.72. It is predicted to have a half-life around 30 hours. C20orf196 contains 19 positive residues (9.3%), 32 negative residues (15.6%), and 46 hydrophobic residues (22.4%).

=== Cellular localization ===
C20orf196 is predicted to localize in the nucleus.

=== Domains ===
C20orf196 contains one domain, DUF4521, which arose in Amniote. DUF4521 spans from amino acid 3 to 201. Several regions of this domain are conserved in c20orf196 orthologs found in mammals, amphibians, and fish. The proteins of this family are functionally uncharacterized.

=== Post-translational modifications ===
There are many phosphorylation sites targeted by unspecified serine kinases. C20orf196 is predicted to have one SUMOylation site at amino acid 203 and one N-glycosylation site at amino acid 69. C20orf196 is predicted to have two ubiquitination sites at amino acids 84 and 139.

=== Secondary structure ===
Several modeling programs predicted a secondary structure containing alpha helix, beta sheet, and coil regions. CFSSP has predicted that C20orf196 secondary structure is 57.1% alpha helices, 48.8% beta strands, and 16.6% beta turns.

=== Protein interactions ===
Several databases citing yeast two-hybrid screenings have found C20orf196 to interact with PRMT1, QARS1, MAD2L2, and CUL3. C20orf196 functionally interacts with REV7, SHLD2, and SHLD3 in the shieldin complex within the DNA repair network.

== Homology and evolution ==
=== Orthologs ===
C20orf196 gene orthologs are found in species including mammals, birds, reptiles, and amphibians. C20orf196 has distant orthologs in bony fish and cartilaginous fish. There are no invertebrate orthologs. Orthologs are found in 163 organisms.

Table of Orthologs for C20orf196
Class	Species	Common name	Date of Divergence (MYA)	Accession number	Sequence Identity (%)	Sequence Similarity (%)
Mammalia (Marsupialia)	Sarcophilus harrisii	Tasmanian devil	159	XP_012395605.1	55	68
Mammalia (Marsupialia)	Phascolarctos cinereus	Koala	159	XP_020841153.1	54	67
Aves	Gallus gallus	Red junglefowl	312	XP_015139412.1	33	49
Aves	Aptenodytes forsteri	Emperor penguin	312	XP_009280865.1	35	47
Reptilia	Crocodylus porosus	Saltwater crocodile	312	XP_019404613.1	36	50
Reptilia	Pogona vitticeps	Central bearded dragon	312	XP_020649300.1	30	46
Reptilia	Thamnophis sirtalis	Common garter snake	312	XP_013911941.1	33	51
Amphibia	Nanorana parkeri	High Himalaya frog	352	XP_018422019.1	39	57
Osteichthyes	Monopterus albus	Asian swamp eel	435	XP_020455013.1	46	73
Chondrichthyes	Rhincodon typus	Whale shark	473	XP_020391945.1	30	55

=== Paralogs ===
There are no paralogs in humans.

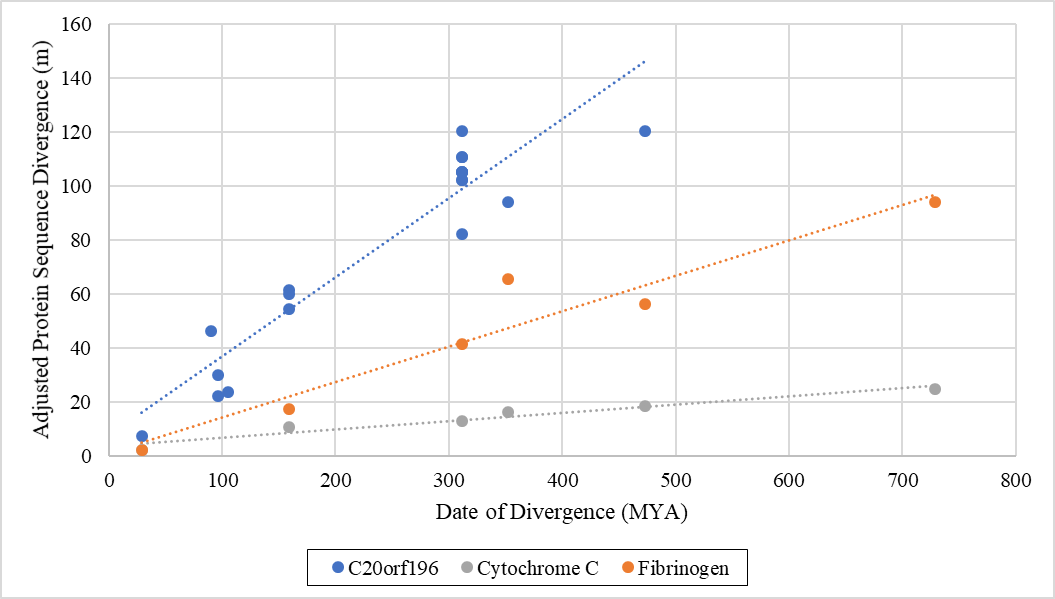
Figure illustrating the evolution rate for C20orf196 in twenty orthologs as compared to the fast-evolving protein, fibrinogen, and slow-evolving protein, cytochrome C.

=== Rate of evolution ===
C20orf196 has a high protein sequence divergence rate. It is a fast evolving protein. It evolves faster than fibrinogen, as seen in the figure to the right.

== Phenotype ==
Genome-wide association studies have identified SNPs found in the C20orf196 gene that are associated with parental longevity, information processing speed, and breast carcinoma occurrence.
