= Glutaminyl-tRNA synthase (glutamine-hydrolysing) =

Glutaminyl-tRNA synthase (glutamine-hydrolyzing)

Identifiers
- EC no.: 6.3.5.7
- CAS no.: 52232-48-1

Databases
- BRENDA: enzyme data
- ExPASy: NiceZyme view
- KEGG: enzyme entry
- MetaCyc: metabolic pathway
- Rhea: reactions
- PDB structures: RCSB PDB PDBe PDBsum
- Gene Ontology: AmiGO / QuickGO
Search
- PMC: articles
- PubMed: articles
- NCBI: proteins

Glu-tRNA^{Gln} amidotransferase or glutaminyl-tRNA synthase (glutamine-hydrolysing) enzyme (EC 6.3.5.7) is an amidotransferase that catalyzes the conversion of the non-cognate amino acid glutamyl-tRNA^{Gln} to the cognate glutaminyl-tRNA^{Gln.}. It catalyzes the reaction:

ATP + glutamyl-tRNA^{Gln} + L-glutamine $\rightleftharpoons$ ADP + phosphate + glutaminyl-tRNA^{Gln} + L-glutamate

This enzyme belongs to the family of ligases, specifically those forming carbon-nitrogen bonds carbon-nitrogen ligases with glutamine as amido-N-donor. The systematic name of this enzyme class is glutamyl-tRNA^{Gln}:L-glutamine amido-ligase (ADP-forming). This enzyme participates in glutamate metabolism and alanine and aspartate metabolism.

== Function and evolutionary significance ==
Most bacterial and all archaea genomes do not encode a glutaminyl-tRNA synthetase (GlnRS). Instead they first synthesize the attachment of an amino acid on the tRNA^{Gln} by first attaching a non-cognate glutamate to the tRNA. Then these organisms use the amidotransferase: glutaminyl-tRNA synthase (glutamine-hydrolysing) (EC 6.3.5.7) enzyme to convert the glutamate attached to tRNA^{Gln} to glutamine.

Similarly, while humans possess a cytoplasmic Glutamine–tRNA ligase, QARS1, there is no apparent mitochondrial form of the enzyme. Instead, the non-discriminating enzyme, EARS2, first mischarges glutamate to tRNA^{Gln}, and then the GatCAB amidotransferase (AdT) complex (QRSL1-GATB-GATC) converts the glutamate to a glutamine.
