= Glu-AdT subunit A =

Protein found in humans

QRSL1

Identifiers
- Aliases: QRSL1, GatA, glutaminyl-tRNA synthase (glutamine-hydrolyzing)-like 1, glutaminyl-tRNA amidotransferase subunit A, glutaminyl-tRNA amidotransferase subunit COXPD40
- External IDs: OMIM: 617209; MGI: 1923813; GeneCards: QRSL1
Enzyme activity
EC #	BRENDA	ExPASy	KEGG	MetaCyc
6.3.5.7	↗	↗	↗	↗

Gene location (Human)
Chr.	Chromosome 6 (human)
Band	6q21	Start	106,629,578 bp
Band	6q21	End	106,668,417 bp

Gene location (Mouse)
Chr.	Chromosome 10 (mouse)
Band	10|10 B2	Start	43,750,184 bp
Band	10|10 B2	End	43,777,741 bp
RNA expression pattern
Bgee	Human / Mouse (ortholog); Top expressed in: muscle of arm; biceps brachii; triceps brachii muscle; Skeletal muscle tissue of biceps brachii; thoracic diaphragm; vastus lateralis muscle; glutes; gastrocnemius muscle; gonad; right ventricle / Top expressed in: substantia nigra; Paneth cell; retinal pigment epithelium; facial motor nucleus; digastric muscle; ciliary body; motor neuron; condyle; sternocleidomastoid muscle; fossa; More reference expression data
BioGPS	n/a
Gene ontology
Molecular function	nucleotide binding; ligase activity; ATP binding; glutaminyl-tRNA synthase (glutamine-hydrolyzing) activity; amidase activity; protein binding; carbon-nitrogen ligase activity, with glutamine as amido-N-donor
Cellular component	glutamyl-tRNA(Gln) amidotransferase complex; mitochondrion
Biological process	regulation of protein stability; protein biosynthesis; mitochondrial translation; glutaminyl-tRNAGln biosynthesis via transamidation
Sources:Amigo / QuickGO
Orthologs
Databases	NCBI: entry; OMA: entry
Species	Human	Mouse
Entrez	55278	76563
Ensembl	ENSG00000130348	ENSMUSG00000019863
UniProt	Q9H0R6	Q9CZN8
RefSeq (mRNA)	NM_018292	NM_001081054
RefSeq (protein)	NP_060762	NP_001074523
Location (UCSC)	Chr 6: 106.63 – 106.67 Mb	Chr 10: 43.75 – 43.78 Mb
PubMed search
- Wikidata
View/Edit Human	View/Edit Mouse

Glutamyl-tRNA(Gln) amidotransferase subunit A, mitochondrial (or Glu-AdT subunit A) is an enzyme that in humans is encoded by the QRSL1 gene. Also called GatA, this protein combines with the proteins GATB and GATC to form the Glu-tRNA(Gln) amidotransferase complex that is involved in incorporating the amino acid glutamine into proteins as part of protein synthesis in the mitochondria.

== Medical significance ==
Pathogenic mutations in the gene QRSL1 are associated with a mitochondrial disease called combined oxidative phosphorylation deficiency-40 (COXPD40). Symptoms typically start at or before birth, and include poor growth, hearing loss, heart problems, and early death.

== See also ==
- EARS2 – Preceding enzyme in pathway
