= Threonine–tRNA ligase =

Class of enzymes

Identifiers
- EC no.: 6.1.1.3
- CAS no.: 9023-46-5

Databases
- BRENDA: enzyme data
- ExPASy: NiceZyme view
- KEGG: enzyme entry
- MetaCyc: metabolic pathway
- Rhea: reactions
- PDB structures: RCSB PDB PDBe PDBsum
- Gene Ontology: AmiGO / QuickGO
Search
- PMC: articles
- PubMed: articles
- NCBI: proteins

In enzymology, a threonine–tRNA ligase (EC 6.1.1.3) is an enzyme that catalyzes the chemical reaction

ATP + L-threonine + tRNA^{Thr} $\rightleftharpoons$ AMP + diphosphate + L-threonyl-tRNA^{Thr}

The three substrates of this enzyme are ATP, L-threonine, and threonine-specific transfer RNA tRNA^{Thr}, whereas its three products are AMP, diphosphate, and L-threonyl-tRNA^{Thr}.

The systematic name of this enzyme class is L-threonine:tRNA^{Thr} ligase (AMP-forming). Other names in common use include threonyl-tRNA synthetase, threonyl-transfer ribonucleate synthetase, threonyl-transfer RNA synthetase, threonyl-transfer ribonucleic acid synthetase, threonyl ribonucleic synthetase, threonine-transfer ribonucleate synthetase, threonine translase, threonyl-tRNA synthetase, and TARS.

Threonine–tRNA ligase (TARS) belongs to the family of ligases, to be specific those forming carbon–oxygen bonds in tRNA and related compounds. More precisely, it belongs to the family of the aminoacyl-tRNA synthetases. These latter enzymes link amino acids to their cognate transfer RNAs (tRNA) in aminoacylation reactions that establish the connection between a specific amino acid and a nucleotide triplet anticodon embedded in the tRNA. During their long evolution, some of these enzymes have acquired additional functions, including roles in RNA splicing, RNA trafficking, transcriptional regulation, translational regulation, and cell signaling.

== Structural studies ==
As of late 2007, 17 structures have been solved for this class of enzymes, with PDB accession codes PDB: 1EVK, PDB: 1EVL, PDB: 1FYF, PDB: 1KOG, PDB: 1NYQ, PDB: 1NYR, PDB: 1QF6, PDB: 1TJE, PDB: 1TKE, PDB: 1TKG, PDB: 1TKY, PDB: 1WWT, PDB: 1Y2Q, PDB: 2HKZ, PDB: 2HL0, PDB: 2HL1, and PDB: 2HL2.

== Translational regulation ==
Threonyl-tRNA synthetase (TARS) from Escherichia coli is encoded by the thrS gene. It is a homodimeric enzyme that aminoacylates tRNA(Thr) with the amino acid threonine. In addition, TARS has the ability to bind to its own messenger RNA (mRNA) immediately upstream of the AUG start codon, to inhibit its translation by competing with ribosome binding, and thus to negatively regulate the expression of its own gene. The cis-acting region responsible for the control, called operator, can be folded into four distinct domains. Each of domains 2 and 4 can be folded in a stem and loop structure that mimics the anticodon arm of E. coli tRNA(Thr). Mutagenesis and biochemical experiments have shown that the two anticodon-like domains of the operator bind to the two tRNA(Thr) anticodon recognition sites (one per subunit) of the dimeric TARS in a quasi-symmetrical manner.

The crystal structures of (i) TARS complexed with two tRNA(Thr) molecules, and (ii) TARS complexed with two isolated domains 2, have confirmed that TARS recognition is primarily governed by similar base-specific interactions between the anticodon loop of tRNA(Thr) and the loop of the operator domain 2. The same amino acids interact with the CGU anticodon sequence of tRNA(Thr) and the analogous residues in domain 2.

== See also ==
- Threonine–tRNA ligase 1, cytoplasmic
- Threonine–tRNA ligase, mitochondrial
