= GATC =

GATC may refer to:

- Girish and The Chronicles, Indian rock band
- Gypsy & The Cat, indie synth rock band
- Georgia Appalachian Trail Club
- Glu-AdT subunit C, a protein encoded by the gene GATC
