= Aminoacyl tRNA synthetases, class I =

Glutamyl/glutaminyl-tRNA synthetase, class Ic

Identifiers
- Symbol: Glu/Gln-tRNA-synth_Ic
- Pfam: PF00749
- InterPro: IPR000924
Available protein structures:
- PDB: PDB: 1euq PDB: 1euy PDB: 1exd PDB: 1g59 PDB: 1gln PDB: 1gsg PDB: 1gtr PDB: 1gts PDB: 1irx PDB: 1j09 IPR000924 PF00749 (ECOD; PDBsum)
- AlphaFold: IPR000924; PF00749

The aminoacyl-tRNA synthetases catalyse the attachment of an amino acid to its cognate transfer RNA molecule in a highly specific two-step reaction. These proteins differ widely in size and oligomeric state, and have limited sequence homology. The 20 aminoacyl-tRNA synthetases are divided into two classes, I and II. Class I aminoacyl-tRNA synthetases contain a characteristic Rossmann fold catalytic domain and are mostly monomeric. Class II aminoacyl-tRNA synthetases share an anti-parallel beta-sheet fold flanked by alpha-helices, and are mostly dimeric or multimeric, containing at least three conserved regions. However, tRNA binding involves an alpha-helical structure that is conserved between class I and class II synthetases. In reactions catalysed by the class I aminoacyl-tRNA synthetases, the aminoacyl group is coupled to the 2'-hydroxyl of the tRNA, while, in class II reactions, the 3'-hydroxyl site is preferred. The synthetases specific for arginine, cysteine, glutamic acid, glutamine, isoleucine, leucine, methionine, tyrosine, tryptophan and valine belong to class I synthetases; these synthetases are further divided into three subclasses, a, b and c, according to sequence homology. The synthetases specific for alanine, asparagine, aspartic acid, glycine, histidine, lysine, phenylalanine, proline, serine, and threonine belong to class-II synthetases.

Glutamyl-tRNA synthetase (EC 6.1.1.17) is a class Ic synthetase and shows several similarities with glutaminyl-tRNA synthetase concerning structure and catalytic properties. It is an alpha2 dimer. To date one crystal structure of a glutamyl-tRNA synthetase (Thermus thermophilus) has been solved. The molecule has the form of a bent cylinder and consists of four domains. The N-terminal half (domains 1 and 2) contains the 'Rossman fold' typical for class I synthetases and resembles the corresponding part of E. coli GlnRS, whereas the C-terminal half exhibits a GluRS-specific structure.

== Human proteins containing this domain ==
EARS2; EPRS1; QARS1;
