= Valine–tRNA ligase =

Class of enzymes

Identifiers
- EC no.: 6.1.1.9
- CAS no.: 9023-47-6

Databases
- BRENDA: enzyme data
- ExPASy: NiceZyme view
- KEGG: enzyme entry
- MetaCyc: metabolic pathway
- Rhea: reactions
- PDB structures: RCSB PDB PDBe PDBsum
- Gene Ontology: AmiGO / QuickGO
Search
- PMC: articles
- PubMed: articles
- NCBI: proteins

In enzymology, a valine–tRNA ligase (EC 6.1.1.9) is an enzyme that catalyzes the chemical reaction

ATP + L-valine + tRNA^{Val} $\rightleftharpoons$ AMP + diphosphate + L-valyl-tRNA^{Val}

The 3 substrates of this enzyme are ATP, L-valine, and tRNA^{Val}, whereas its 3 products are AMP, diphosphate, and L-valyl-tRNA^{Val}. In humans, this enzyme is encoded by the genes VARS1 and VARS2.

This enzyme belongs to the family of ligases, to be specific those forming carbon-oxygen bonds in aminoacyl-tRNA and related compounds. The systematic name of this enzyme class is L-valine:tRNA^{Val} ligase (AMP-forming). Other names in common use include valyl-tRNA synthetase, valyl-transfer ribonucleate synthetase, valyl-transfer RNA synthetase, valyl-transfer ribonucleic acid synthetase, valine transfer ribonucleate ligase, and valine translase. This enzyme participates in valine, leucine and isoleucine biosynthesis, and aminoacyl-tRNA biosynthesis.

== Structural studies ==
As of late 2007, 5 structures have been solved for this class of enzymes, with PDB accession codes PDB: 1GAX, PDB: 1IVS, PDB: 1IYW, PDB: 1WK9, and PDB: 1WKA.

== See also ==
- VARS
