= Isoleucine–tRNA ligase =

Class of enzymes

Identifiers
- EC no.: 6.1.1.5
- CAS no.: 9030-96-0

Databases
- BRENDA: enzyme data
- ExPASy: NiceZyme view
- KEGG: enzyme entry
- MetaCyc: metabolic pathway
- Rhea: reactions
- PDB structures: RCSB PDB PDBe PDBsum
- Gene Ontology: AmiGO / QuickGO
Search
- PMC: articles
- PubMed: articles
- NCBI: proteins

In enzymology, an isoleucine–tRNA ligase (EC 6.1.1.5) is an enzyme that catalyzes a two-step reaction in which isoleucine is attached to its corresponding tRNA molecule:

isoleucine + ATP → isoleucyl-AMP + PP_{i}

isoleucyl-AMP + tRNA^{Ile} → isoleucyl-tRNA^{Ile} + AMP

The 3 substrates of this enzyme are ATP, L-isoleucine, and tRNA^{Ile}, whereas its 3 products are AMP, diphosphate, and L-isoleucyl-tRNA^{Ile}.

Two known isozymes exist in humans, encoded by the genes IARS1 and IARS2. This enzyme belongs to the family of ligases, to be specific those forming carbon–oxygen bonds in aminoacyl-tRNA and related compounds. The systematic name of this enzyme class is L-isoleucine:tRNA^{Ile} ligase (AMP-forming). Other names in common use include isoleucyl-tRNA synthetase, isoleucyl-transfer ribonucleate synthetase, isoleucyl-transfer RNA synthetase, isoleucine-transfer RNA ligase, isoleucine-tRNA synthetase, and isoleucine translase. This enzyme participates in valine, leucine and isoleucine biosynthesis and aminoacyl-tRNA biosynthesis.

== Structural studies ==
As of late 2007, 10 structures have been solved for this class of enzymes, with PDB accession codes PDB: 1FFY, PDB: 1JZQ, PDB: 1JZS, PDB: 1QU2, PDB: 1QU3, PDB: 1UDZ, PDB: 1UE0, PDB: 1WK8, PDB: 1WNY, and PDB: 1WNZ.
