= Isoleucine–tRNA ligase, cytoplasmic =

Enzyme found in humans

IARS1

Identifiers
- Aliases: IARS1, isoleucyl-tRNA synthetase 1, ILERS, isoleucyl-tRNA synthetase, PRO0785, GRIDHH, IRS, ILRS, IARS
- External IDs: OMIM: 600709; MGI: 2145219; GeneCards: IARS1
Enzyme activity
EC #	BRENDA	ExPASy	KEGG	MetaCyc
6.1.1.5	↗	↗	↗	↗

Gene location (Human)
Chr.	Chromosome 9 (human)
Band	9q22.31	Start	92,210,207 bp
Band	9q22.31	End	92,293,756 bp

Gene location (Mouse)
Chr.	Chromosome 13 (mouse)
Band	13|13 A5	Start	49,835,576 bp
Band	13|13 A5	End	49,887,743 bp
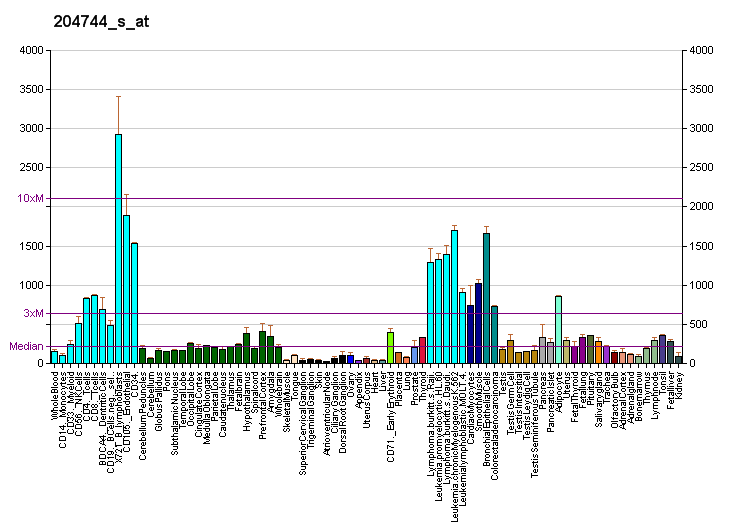
RNA expression pattern
Bgee	Human / Mouse (ortholog); Top expressed in: cartilage tissue; corpus epididymis; middle temporal gyrus; tail of epididymis; Skeletal muscle tissue of biceps brachii; caput epididymis; right ventricle; oral cavity; glutes; trabecular bone / Top expressed in: primary oocyte; motor neuron; secondary oocyte; primitive streak; tail of embryo; migratory enteric neural crest cell; lacrimal gland; seminal vesicula; somite; Gonadal ridge; More reference expression data
BioGPS	More reference expression data
Gene ontology
Molecular function	aminoacyl-tRNA ligase activity; nucleotide binding; ligase activity; protein binding; GTPase binding; ATP binding; aminoacyl-tRNA editing activity; tRNA binding; isoleucine-tRNA ligase activity
Cellular component	membrane; extracellular exosome; cytoplasm; aminoacyl-tRNA synthetase multienzyme complex; cytosol
Biological process	protein biosynthesis; tRNA aminoacylation for protein translation; osteoblast differentiation; regulation of translational fidelity; isoleucyl-tRNA aminoacylation; aminoacyl-tRNA metabolism involved in translational fidelity
Sources:Amigo / QuickGO
Orthologs
Databases	NCBI: entry; OMA: entry
Species	Human	Mouse
Entrez	3376	105148
Ensembl	ENSG00000196305	ENSMUSG00000037851
UniProt	P41252; Q6P0M4	Q8BU30
RefSeq (mRNA)	NM_002161; NM_013417; NM_001374299; NM_001374300; NM_001374301	NM_172015
RefSeq (protein)	NP_002152; NP_038203; NP_001361228; NP_001361229; NP_001361230 NP_001365498; NP_001365500; NP_001365501; NP_001365502; NP_001365503; NP_001365504; NP_001365505; NP_001365506; NP_001365507; NP_001365508; NP_001365509; NP_001365511; NP_001365512; NP_001365513; NP_001365514; NP_001365515; NP_002152.2	NP_742012
Location (UCSC)	Chr 9: 92.21 – 92.29 Mb	Chr 13: 49.84 – 49.89 Mb
PubMed search
- Wikidata
View/Edit Human	View/Edit Mouse

Isoleucine–tRNA ligase, cytoplasmic, also called isoleucyl-tRNA synthetase, cytoplasmic, is an enzyme that in humans is encoded by the IARS1 gene (previously IARS). Like the related enzyme, IARS2, this enzyme functions as an isoleucine–tRNA ligase, meaning it attaches the amino acid isoleucine to its corresponding transfer RNA (tRNA^{Ile}) as part of protein synthesis.

Aminoacyl-tRNA synthetases catalyze the aminoacylation of tRNA by their cognate amino acid. Because of their central role in linking amino acids with nucleotide triplets contained in tRNAS, aminoacyl-tRNA synthetases are thought to be among the first proteins that appeared in evolution. Isoleucine-tRNA synthetase belongs to the class-I aminoacyl-tRNA synthetase family and has been identified as a target of autoantibodies in the autoimmune disease polymyositis/dermatomyositis. Two alternatively spliced variants have been isolated that represent alternate 5' UTRs.

== Interactions ==
IARS has been shown to interact with EPRS.

== Medical significance ==
Pathogenic mutations in IARS1 (compound heterozygous) are the cause of a disorder associated with impaired physical and intellectual development, and sometimes liver disfunction, called GRIDHH (growth retardation, impaired intellectual development, hypotonia, and hepatopathy).
