= Isoleucine–tRNA ligase, mitochondrial =

Enzyme found in humans

IARS2

Identifiers
- Aliases: IARS2, ILERS, CAGSSS, isoleucyl-tRNA synthetase 2, mitochondrial
- External IDs: OMIM: 612801; MGI: 1919586; GeneCards: IARS2
Enzyme activity
EC #	BRENDA	ExPASy	KEGG	MetaCyc
6.1.1.5	↗	↗	↗	↗

Gene location (Human)
Chr.	Chromosome 1 (human)
Band	1q41	Start	220,094,132 bp
Band	1q41	End	220,148,041 bp
RNA expression pattern
Bgee	Human / Mouse (ortholog); Top expressed in: thoracic diaphragm; parietal pleura; Skeletal muscle tissue of biceps brachii; bronchial epithelial cell; myocardium of left ventricle; right ventricle; vastus lateralis muscle; epithelium of nasopharynx; tendon of biceps brachii; mucosa of sigmoid colon / n/a; More reference expression data
BioGPS	n/a
Gene ontology
Molecular function	aminoacyl-tRNA ligase activity; nucleotide binding; ligase activity; ATP binding; aminoacyl-tRNA editing activity; tRNA binding; isoleucine-tRNA ligase activity
Cellular component	mitochondrial matrix; cytoplasm; mitochondrion; cytosol
Biological process	tRNA aminoacylation for protein translation; protein biosynthesis; isoleucyl-tRNA aminoacylation; aminoacyl-tRNA metabolism involved in translational fidelity; mitochondrial translation
Sources:Amigo / QuickGO
Orthologs
Databases	NCBI: entry; OMA: entry
Species	Human	Mouse
Entrez	55699	381314
Ensembl	ENSG00000067704	n/a
UniProt	Q9NSE4	Q8BIJ6
RefSeq (mRNA)	NM_018060	NM_198653
RefSeq (protein)	NP_060530	NP_941055
Location (UCSC)	Chr 1: 220.09 – 220.15 Mb	n/a
PubMed search
- Wikidata
View/Edit Human	View/Edit Mouse

Isoleucine–tRNA ligase, mitochondrial, also called isoleucyl-tRNA synthetase 2, is an enzyme that in humans is encoded by the IARS2 gene. Like the analogous cytoplasmic enzyme, IARS1, this isoleucine–tRNA ligase functions to attach the amino acid isoleucine to the corresponding transfer RNA (tRNA^{Ile}) in preparation of RNA-to-protein translation.

== Medical Significance ==
Pathogenic mutations in IARS2 are associated with heterogeneous symptoms, which may include cataracts, hearing loss, atypical skeletal features, and deficiencies in growth hormone. This disorder has been named cataracts, growth hormone deficiency, sensory neuropathy, sensorineural hearing loss, and skeletal dysplasia (CAGSSS), and is inherited in an autosomal dominant fashion.

== See also ==
- Aminoacyl tRNA synthetase
