= Arginine–tRNA ligase, cytoplasmic =

Enzyme found in humans

RARS1

Identifiers
- Aliases: RARS1, ArgRS, DALRD1, HLD9, arginyl-tRNA synthetase, arginyl-tRNA synthetase 1, RARS
- External IDs: OMIM: 107820; MGI: 1914297; GeneCards: RARS1
Available structures
PDB	Ortholog search: PDBe RCSB
PDB	List of PDB id codes 4Q2T, 4Q2X, 4Q2Y, 4R3Z, 4ZAJ
Enzyme activity
EC #	BRENDA	ExPASy	KEGG	MetaCyc
6.1.1.19	↗	↗	↗	↗

Gene location (Human)
Chr.	Chromosome 5 (human)
Band	5q34	Start	168,486,451 bp
Band	5q34	End	168,519,301 bp

Gene location (Mouse)
Chr.	Chromosome 11 (mouse)
Band	11|11 A4	Start	35,699,208 bp
Band	11|11 A4	End	35,725,333 bp
RNA expression pattern
Bgee	Human / Mouse (ortholog); Top expressed in: Achilles tendon; jejunal mucosa; rectum; islet of Langerhans; duodenum; body of pancreas; gonad; stromal cell of endometrium; skin of leg; skin of abdomen / Top expressed in: tail of embryo; primitive streak; genital tubercle; hair follicle; epiblast; gastrula; endothelial cell of lymphatic vessel; yolk sac; crypt of lieberkuhn of small intestine; fetal liver hematopoietic progenitor cell; More reference expression data
BioGPS	n/a
Gene ontology
Molecular function	aminoacyl-tRNA ligase activity; nucleotide binding; tRNA binding; arginine binding; ligase activity; protein binding; ATP binding; cadherin binding; arginine-tRNA ligase activity
Cellular component	membrane; nucleoplasm; mitochondrion; extracellular exosome; nucleus; cytoplasm; aminoacyl-tRNA synthetase multienzyme complex; cytosol
Biological process	protein biosynthesis; tRNA aminoacylation for protein translation; arginyl-tRNA aminoacylation
Sources:Amigo / QuickGO
Orthologs
Databases	NCBI: entry; OMA: entry
Species	Human	Mouse
Entrez	5917	104458
Ensembl	ENSG00000113643	ENSMUSG00000018848
UniProt	P54136	Q9D0I9
RefSeq (mRNA)	NM_002887	NM_025936
RefSeq (protein)	NP_002878	NP_080212
Location (UCSC)	Chr 5: 168.49 – 168.52 Mb	Chr 11: 35.7 – 35.73 Mb
PubMed search
- Wikidata
View/Edit Human	View/Edit Mouse

Arginine–tRNA ligase, cytoplasmic, or arginyl-tRNA synthetase 1, is an enzyme that in humans is encoded by the RARS1 gene (previously RARS). This enzyme (like the mitochondrial form, RARS2) functions as a Arginine–tRNA ligase, which means it attaches the amino acid arginine to the corresponding transfer RNA (tRNA^{Arg}) as part of RNA-to-protein translation.

Aminoacyl-tRNA synthetases catalyze the aminoacylation of tRNA by their cognate amino acid. Because of their central role in linking amino acids with nucleotide triplets contained in tRNAs, aminoacyl-tRNA synthetases are thought to be among the first proteins that appeared in evolution. Arginyl-tRNA synthetase belongs to the class-I aminoacyl-tRNA synthetase family.

== Medical significance ==
Mutations in RARS1 can cause hypomyelination.

== Interactions ==
RARS1 has been shown to interact with QARS1.
