= Aminoacyl tRNA synthetases, class II =

Protein family

Aminoacyl-tRNA synthetase, class II

Identifiers
- Symbol: Aa-tRNA-synt_II
- Pfam: PF00152
- InterPro: IPR006195
- CDD: cd00768
Available protein structures:
- PDB: PDB: 1asy PDB: 1asz PDB: 1b8a PDB: 1bbu PDB: 1bbw PDB: 1c0a PDB: 1e1o PDB: 1e1t PDB: 1e22 PDB: 1e24 IPR006195 PF00152 (ECOD; PDBsum)
- AlphaFold: IPR006195; PF00152

Aminoacyl-tRNA synthetases, class II are a family of proteins. These proteins catalyse the attachment of an amino acid to its cognate transfer RNA molecule in a highly specific two-step reaction. These proteins differ widely in size and oligomeric state, and have a limited sequence homology.

The 20 aminoacyl-tRNA synthetases are divided into two classes, I and II. Class I aminoacyl-tRNA synthetases contain a characteristic Rossman fold catalytic domain and are mostly monomeric. Class II aminoacyl-tRNA synthetases share an anti-parallel beta-sheet fold flanked by alpha-helices, and are mostly dimeric or multimeric, containing at least three conserved regions. However, tRNA binding involves an alpha-helical structure that is conserved between class I and class II synthetases. In reactions catalysed by the class I aminoacyl-tRNA synthetases, the aminoacyl group is coupled to the 2'-hydroxyl of the tRNA, while, in class II reactions, the 3'-hydroxyl site is preferred. The synthetases specific for arginine, cysteine, glutamic acid, glutamine, isoleucine, leucine, methionine, tyrosine, tryptophan and valine belong to class I synthetases; these synthetases are further divided into three subclasses, a, b and c, according to sequence homology. The synthetases specific for alanine, asparagine, aspartic acid, glycine, histidine, lysine, phenylalanine, proline, serine, and threonine belong to class-II synthetases.

== Human proteins containing this domain ==
- DARS1
- DARS2
- KARS1
- NARS1
- NARS2
