= Threonine–tRNA ligase, mitochondrial =

Enzyme found in humans

TARS2

Identifiers
- Aliases: TARS2, COXPD21, TARSL1, thrRS, threonyl-tRNA synthetase 2, mitochondrial (putative), threonyl-tRNA synthetase 2, mitochondrial
- External IDs: OMIM: 612805; MGI: 1919057; GeneCards: TARS2
Enzyme activity
EC #	BRENDA	ExPASy	KEGG	MetaCyc
6.1.1.3	↗	↗	↗	↗

Gene location (Human)
Chr.	Chromosome 1 (human)
Band	1q21.2	Start	150,487,414 bp
Band	1q21.2	End	150,507,602 bp

Gene location (Mouse)
Chr.	Chromosome 3 (mouse)
Band	3|3 F2.1	Start	95,647,288 bp
Band	3|3 F2.1	End	95,667,518 bp
RNA expression pattern
Bgee	Human / Mouse (ortholog); Top expressed in: gastrocnemius muscle; apex of heart; muscle of thigh; cerebellar vermis; triceps brachii muscle; right adrenal gland; left ventricle; right hemisphere of cerebellum; buccal mucosa cell; right lobe of liver / Top expressed in: ectoderm; otic vesicle; otic placode; saccule; spermatocyte; epiblast; blastocyst; crypt of lieberkuhn of small intestine; motor neuron; Paneth cell; More reference expression data
BioGPS	n/a
Gene ontology
Molecular function	aminoacyl-tRNA ligase activity; nucleotide binding; ligase activity; ATP binding; aminoacyl-tRNA editing activity; protein homodimerization activity; threonine-tRNA ligase activity
Cellular component	cytoplasm; mitochondrial matrix; mitochondrion; cellular component
Biological process	mitochondrial threonyl-tRNA aminoacylation; threonyl-tRNA aminoacylation; tRNA aminoacylation; protein biosynthesis; tRNA aminoacylation for protein translation; aminoacyl-tRNA metabolism involved in translational fidelity
Sources:Amigo / QuickGO
Orthologs
Databases	NCBI: entry; OMA: entry
Species	Human	Mouse
Entrez	80222	71807
Ensembl	ENSG00000143374	ENSMUSG00000028107
UniProt	Q9BW92	Q3UQ84
RefSeq (mRNA)	NM_001271895; NM_001271896; NM_025150	NM_001163617; NM_001163618; NM_001163619; NM_027931; NM_001356965 NM_001356966; NM_001356967
RefSeq (protein)	NP_001258824; NP_001258825; NP_079426	NP_001157089; NP_001157090; NP_001157091; NP_082207; NP_001343894 NP_001343895; NP_001343896
Location (UCSC)	Chr 1: 150.49 – 150.51 Mb	Chr 3: 95.65 – 95.67 Mb
PubMed search
- Wikidata
View/Edit Human	View/Edit Mouse

Threonine–tRNA ligase, mitochondrial, also called threonyl-tRNA synthetase 2, is an enzyme that in humans is encoded by the TARS2 gene. Like the related cytosolic threonine–tRNA ligase, TARS1, this enzyme functions to attach the amino acid threonine to its corresponding transfer RNA (tRNA^{Thr}). This produces an aminoacyl-tRNA which is needed to incorporate threonine into proteins during RNA-to-protein translation.

== Function ==
Cartoon illustration of translation

This enzyme is part of the class-II aminoacyl-tRNA synthetase family. Aminoacyl tRNA synthetases are enzymes that charge tRNA with the amino acids of the appropriate type, which in this case means attaching threonine to tRNA^{Thr}. During translation, the produced aminoacyl-tRNAs are used to translate the mRNA code into the corresponding amino acid sequence and protein.

== Medical Significance ==
Pathogenic mutations in TARS2 are associated with a growth defects, seizures, and early death, called combined oxidative phosphorylation deficiency-21 (COXPD21). This illness appears to follow an autosomal recessive inheritance pattern.
