= Threonine–tRNA ligase 1, cytoplasmic =

Enzyme found in humans

TARS1
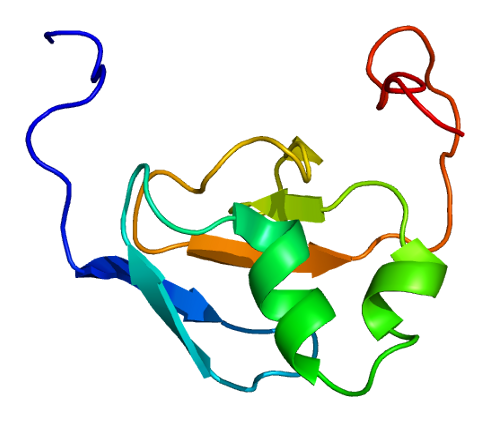

Identifiers
- Aliases: TARS1, ThrRS, threonyl-tRNA synthetase, TARS, threonyl-tRNA synthetase 1, TTD7
- External IDs: OMIM: 187790; MGI: 106314; GeneCards: TARS1
Available structures
PDB	Ortholog search: PDBe RCSB
PDB	List of PDB id codes 1WWT, 4HWT, 4P3N, 4TTV
Enzyme activity
EC #	BRENDA	ExPASy	KEGG	MetaCyc
6.1.1.3	↗	↗	↗	↗

Gene location (Human)
Chr.	Chromosome 5 (human)
Band	5p13.3	Start	33,440,696 bp
Band	5p13.3	End	33,468,091 bp

Gene location (Mouse)
Chr.	Chromosome 15 (mouse)
Band	15 A1|15 5.6 cM	Start	11,382,387 bp
Band	15 A1|15 5.6 cM	End	11,399,751 bp
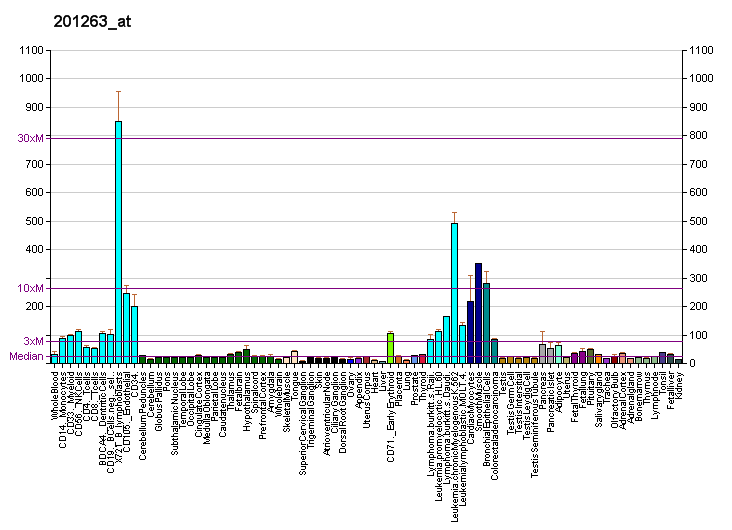
RNA expression pattern
Bgee	Human / Mouse (ortholog); Top expressed in: sural nerve; islet of Langerhans; mucosa of transverse colon; gums; gingival epithelium; ventricular zone; buccal mucosa cell; epithelium of colon; oral cavity; cartilage tissue / Top expressed in: primitive streak; epiblast; endothelial cell of lymphatic vessel; seminal vesicula; calvaria; hair follicle; left lobe of liver; genital tubercle; tail of embryo; lacrimal gland; More reference expression data
BioGPS	More reference expression data
Gene ontology
Molecular function	aminoacyl-tRNA ligase activity; nucleotide binding; ligase activity; protein binding; ATP binding; protein homodimerization activity; threonine-tRNA ligase activity; tRNA binding; RNA binding
Cellular component	extracellular exosome; actin cytoskeleton; cytoplasm; cytosol
Biological process	tRNA aminoacylation; tRNA aminoacylation for protein translation; protein biosynthesis; threonyl-tRNA aminoacylation
Sources:Amigo / QuickGO
Orthologs
Databases	NCBI: entry; OMA: entry
Species	Human	Mouse
Entrez	6897	110960
Ensembl	ENSG00000113407	ENSMUSG00000022241
UniProt	P26639	Q9D0R2
RefSeq (mRNA)	NM_001258437; NM_001258438; NM_152295	NM_033074
RefSeq (protein)	NP_001245366; NP_001245367; NP_689508	NP_149065
Location (UCSC)	Chr 5: 33.44 – 33.47 Mb	Chr 15: 11.38 – 11.4 Mb
PubMed search
- Wikidata
View/Edit Human	View/Edit Mouse

Threonine–tRNA ligase 1, cytoplasmic, also called threonyl-tRNA synthetase 1, is an enzyme that in humans is encoded by the TARS1 gene. Like its relatives, TARS2 and TARS3, this enzyme functions as a threonine–tRNA ligase, which means it attaches the animo acid threonine to its corresponding transfer RNA as part of RNA-to-protein translation.

== Function ==
Aminoacyl tRNA synthetases catalyze the aminoacylation of tRNA by their cognate amino acid. Because of their central role in linking amino acids with nucleotide triplets contained in tRNAs, aminoacyl-tRNA synthetases are thought to be among the first proteins that appeared in evolution. Threonyl-tRNA synthetase belongs to the class-II aminoacyl-tRNA synthetase family.

== Comparison with TARS3 ==
Cytoplasmic threonine–tRNA ligase is unique in vertebrate aminoacyl-tRNA synthetases in having a second form, TARS3 (previously called TARSL2), evolved from a gene duplication. In mice, the TARS1 enzyme is significantly more prevalent (55x in lungs, and 3x in muscles). Structurally, TARS1 functions as a homodimer, while TARS3 may instead be a component of the protein complex: multisynthetase complex (MSC). TARS1 is also smaller, 83 kD vs. 93 kD, and this has been used to infer that it is the primary target of the antibodies involved in antisynthetase syndrome.

== Medical significance ==
Pathogenic (homozygous and compound heterozygous) mutations in TARS1 are associated with trichothiodystrophy (a type of hair fragility disorder), with the type caused by TARS1 mutation designated as: nonphotosensitive trichothiodystrophy-7 (TTD7).
