= YqeY protein domain =

YqeY
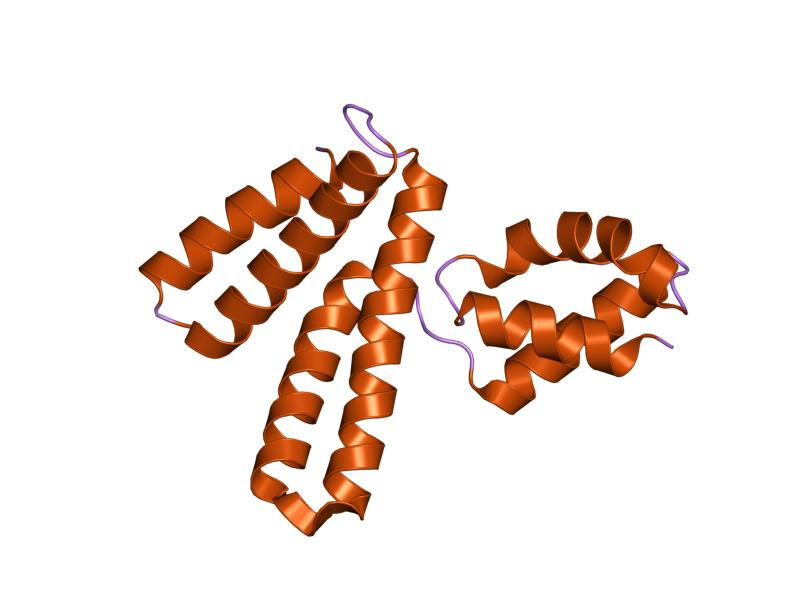
- Structure of cytosolic protein of unknown function YqeY from Bacillus subtilis

Identifiers
- Symbol: YqeY
- Pfam: PF09424
- Pfam clan: CL0279
- InterPro: IPR019004
- SCOP2: 1ng5 / SCOPe / SUPFAM
Available protein structures:
- PDB: IPR019004 PF09424 (ECOD; PDBsum)
- AlphaFold: IPR019004; PF09424

In molecular biology, YqeY is a type of protein domain of unknown function. It is thought to have a role in protein synthesis, facilitating the production of charged transfer RNA used in the process of translating mRNA into protein. It is present as a domain of glutaminyl-tRNA synthetase (GlnRS) in almost all eukaryotes.

== Function ==
The YqeY domain has been found to be involved in the recognition of tRNA charged with the amino acid glutamine (tRNA-Gln). In some cases YqeY also increases the affinity of GlnRS for tRNA-Gln, but only when present in cis (that is, as part of the GlnRS polypeptide chain). However, the presence of YqeY as a standalone domain in organisms without GlnRS suggests that YqeY domains may have additional cellular functions.

== Homology ==
This protein domain shares sequence homology with the C-terminal domain of GatB and GatE, the tRNA-binding subunits of bacterial and archaeal glutamine amidotransferases.
