= Alanine–tRNA ligase, mitochondrial =

Enzyme found in humans

AARS2

Identifiers
- Aliases: AARS2, AARSL, COXPD8, LKENP, MT-ALARS, MTALARS, alanyl-tRNA synthetase 2, mitochondrial
- External IDs: OMIM: 612035; MGI: 2681839; GeneCards: AARS2
Enzyme activity
EC #	BRENDA	ExPASy	KEGG	MetaCyc
6.1.1.7	↗	↗	↗	↗

Gene location (Human)
Chr.	Chromosome 6 (human)
Band	6p21.1	Start	44,298,731 bp
Band	6p21.1	End	44,313,347 bp

Gene location (Mouse)
Chr.	Chromosome 17 (mouse)
Band	17|17 B3	Start	45,817,767 bp
Band	17|17 B3	End	45,831,769 bp
RNA expression pattern
Bgee	Human / Mouse (ortholog); Top expressed in: tendon of biceps brachii; pancreatic ductal cell; nipple; skin of arm; cerebellar vermis; vena cava; mucosa of ileum; endothelial cell; vulva; pylorus / Top expressed in: otolith organ; utricle; hand; seminiferous tubule; spermatocyte; epiblast; foot; quadriceps femoris muscle; right kidney; knee joint; More reference expression data
BioGPS	n/a
Gene ontology
Molecular function	aminoacyl-tRNA ligase activity; nucleotide binding; amino acid binding; tRNA binding; metal ion binding; ligase activity; RNA binding; nucleic acid binding; alanine-tRNA ligase activity; ATP binding; zinc ion binding; aminoacyl-tRNA editing activity
Cellular component	cytoplasm; mitochondrion
Biological process	tRNA aminoacylation; protein biosynthesis; alanyl-tRNA aminoacylation; tRNA modification; mitochondrial alanyl-tRNA aminoacylation; mitochondrial respiratory chain complex assembly; aminoacyl-tRNA metabolism involved in translational fidelity
Sources:Amigo / QuickGO
Orthologs
Databases	NCBI: entry; OMA: entry
Species	Human	Mouse
Entrez	57505	224805
Ensembl	ENSG00000124608	ENSMUSG00000023938
UniProt	Q5JTZ9	Q14CH7
RefSeq (mRNA)	NM_020745	NM_198608; NM_001358000
RefSeq (protein)	NP_065796	NP_941010; NP_001344929
Location (UCSC)	Chr 6: 44.3 – 44.31 Mb	Chr 17: 45.82 – 45.83 Mb
PubMed search
- Wikidata
View/Edit Human	View/Edit Mouse

Alanine–tRNA ligase, mitochondrial, also known as alanyl-tRNA synthetase 2 (AARS2), is an enzyme that in humans is encoded by the AARS2 gene. Like the cytosolic variety, AARS2, this enzyme functions as an alanine–tRNA ligase, which means it attaches the amino acid alanine to the corresponding transfer RNA (tRNA^{Ala}) in preparation of RNA-to-protein translation.

== Clinical relevance ==
Mutations in the AARS2 gene result in infantile mitochondrial cardiomyopathies. Progressive leukoencephalopathy with Ovarian Failure (LKENP).

== See also ==
- Aminoacyl tRNA synthetase
