= Asparagine–tRNA ligase, cytoplasmic =

Enzyme found in humans

NARS1

Identifiers
- Aliases: NARS1, NARS, NEDMILG, NEDMILEG, ASNRS, asparaginyl-tRNA synthetase 1, asparaginyl-tRNA synthetase
- External IDs: OMIM: 108410; MGI: 1917473; GeneCards: NARS1
Available structures
PDB	Ortholog search: PDBe RCSB
PDB	List of PDB id codes 4ZYA
Enzyme activity
EC #	BRENDA	ExPASy	KEGG	MetaCyc
6.1.1.22	↗	↗	↗	↗

Gene location (Human)
Chr.	Chromosome 18 (human)
Band	18q21.31	Start	57,600,656 bp
Band	18q21.31	End	57,622,213 bp

Gene location (Mouse)
Chr.	Chromosome 18 (mouse)
Band	18|18 E1	Start	64,632,718 bp
Band	18|18 E1	End	64,649,723 bp
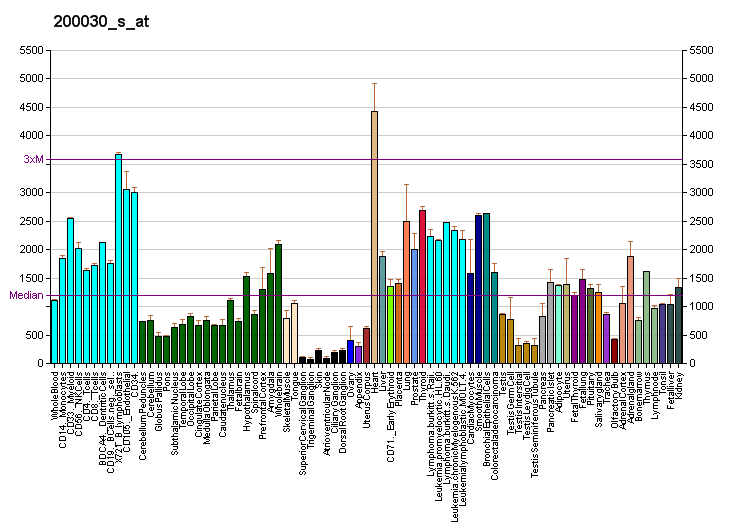

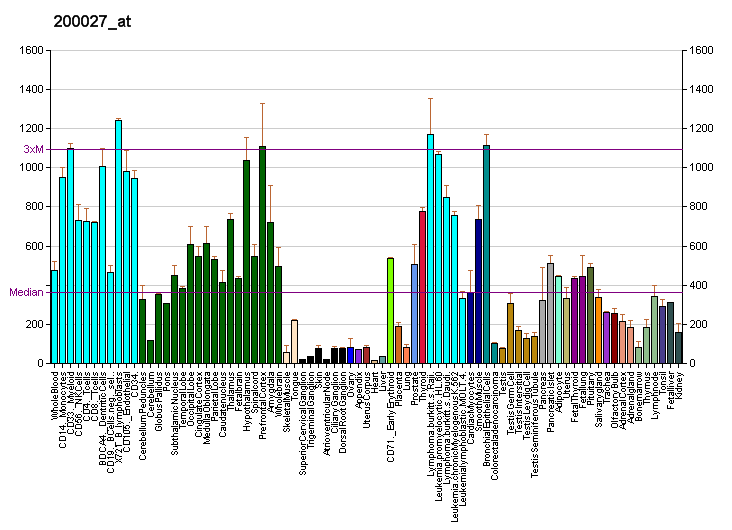

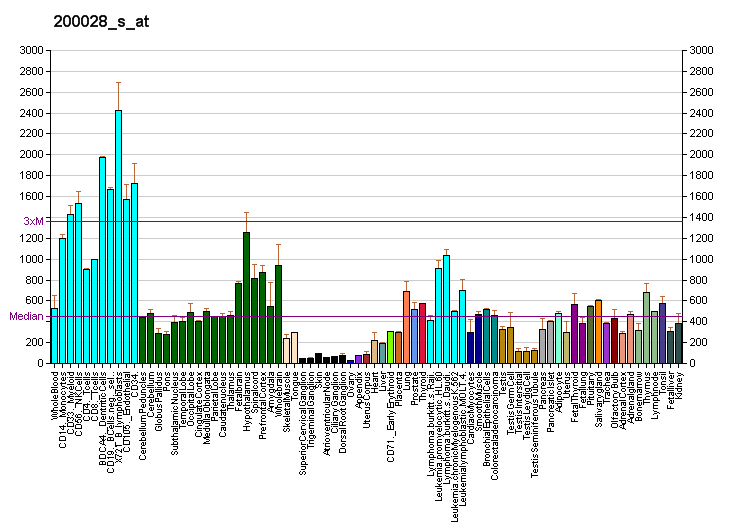
RNA expression pattern
Bgee	Human / Mouse (ortholog); Top expressed in: endothelial cell; pancreatic ductal cell; Brodmann area 23; lateral nuclear group of thalamus; middle temporal gyrus; kidney tubule; gingival epithelium; mucosa of sigmoid colon; parotid gland; Epithelium of choroid plexus / Top expressed in: facial motor nucleus; Paneth cell; motor neuron; lacrimal gland; gastrula; calvaria; seminal vesicula; anterior horn of spinal cord; parotid gland; decidua; More reference expression data
BioGPS	More reference expression data
Gene ontology
Molecular function	aminoacyl-tRNA ligase activity; nucleotide binding; ligase activity; asparagine-tRNA ligase activity; ATP binding; nucleic acid binding
Cellular component	extracellular exosome; mitochondrion; cytoplasm; cytosol
Biological process	protein biosynthesis; asparaginyl-tRNA aminoacylation; tRNA aminoacylation for protein translation
Sources:Amigo / QuickGO
Orthologs
Databases	NCBI: entry; OMA: entry
Species	Human	Mouse
Entrez	4677	70223
Ensembl	ENSG00000134440	ENSMUSG00000024587
UniProt	O43776	Q8BP47
RefSeq (mRNA)	NM_004539	NM_001142950; NM_027350; NM_001377021; NM_001377022; NM_001377023
RefSeq (protein)	NP_004530	NP_001136422; NP_081626
Location (UCSC)	Chr 18: 57.6 – 57.62 Mb	Chr 18: 64.63 – 64.65 Mb
PubMed search
- Wikidata
View/Edit Human	View/Edit Mouse

Asparagine–tRNA ligase, cytoplasmic, also called asparaginyl-tRNA synthetase 1, is an enzyme that in humans is encoded by the NARS1 gene. NARS1 functions to attach the amino acid asparagine to its corresponding transfer RNA (tRNA^{Asn}), which is important for incorporating asparagine into proteins during protein synthesis.

== Function ==
The NARS1 protein is an example of an aminoacyl-tRNA synthetase, which are a class of enzymes that charge tRNAs with their cognate amino acids, in this case attaching asparagine to tRNA^{Asn} to form the aminoacyl-tRNA, L-asparaginyl-tRNA^{Asn}. This enzyme typically binds with another copy of itself to form a homodimer, and does not appear to be part of the multi-synthetase complex.

In humans, NARS1 is particularly important in the development of the cerebral cortex, where it is required for the proliferation of radial glial cells. Outside of its core role in protein synthesis, it can also act as a signaling molecule which is able to induce the migration of CCR3-expressing cells.

== Family ==
Cytoplasmic asparaginyl-tRNA synthetase belongs to the class II-b family of tRNA synthetases along with Aspartyl-tRNA synthetase and Lysyl-tRNA synthetase II. The N-terminal domain represents the signature sequence for the eukaryotic asparaginyl-tRNA synthetases.

== Medical significance ==
Certain heterozygous mutations in NARS1 are associated with a brain development and neurological disorder called neurodevelopmental disorder with microcephaly, impaired language, epilepsy, and gait abnormalities (NEDMILEG). More diverse pathogenic homozygous and compound heterozygous are also associated with a syndrome with many similar symptoms called neurodevelopmental disorder with microcephaly, impaired language, and gait abnormalities (NEDMILG)

== See also ==
- Asparagine–tRNA ligase, mitochondrial
