= Asparagine–tRNA ligase, mitochondrial =

Enzyme found in humans

NARS2

Identifiers
- Aliases: NARS2, SLM5, asnRS, DFNB94, asparaginyl-tRNA synthetase 2, mitochondrial (putative), asparaginyl-tRNA synthetase 2, mitochondrial
- External IDs: OMIM: 612803; MGI: 2142075; GeneCards: NARS2
Enzyme activity
EC #	BRENDA	ExPASy	KEGG	MetaCyc
6.1.1.22	↗	↗	↗	↗

Gene location (Human)
Chr.	Chromosome 11 (human)
Band	11q14.1	Start	78,435,968 bp
Band	11q14.1	End	78,574,874 bp

Gene location (Mouse)
Chr.	Chromosome 7 (mouse)
Band	7|7 E1	Start	96,600,712 bp
Band	7|7 E1	End	96,713,965 bp
RNA expression pattern
Bgee	Human / Mouse (ortholog); Top expressed in: secondary oocyte; Skeletal muscle tissue of biceps brachii; gonad; vastus lateralis muscle; ventricular zone; retinal pigment epithelium; embryo; ganglionic eminence; deltoid muscle; thoracic diaphragm / Top expressed in: right kidney; Paneth cell; trigeminal ganglion; tail of embryo; spermatocyte; left lobe of liver; facial motor nucleus; spermatid; ventricular zone; superior cervical ganglion; More reference expression data
BioGPS	n/a
Gene ontology
Molecular function	aminoacyl-tRNA ligase activity; nucleotide binding; ligase activity; asparagine-tRNA ligase activity; ATP binding; nucleic acid binding
Cellular component	cytoplasm; mitochondrial matrix; mitochondrion; nucleoplasm; cytosol
Biological process	protein biosynthesis; asparaginyl-tRNA aminoacylation; tRNA aminoacylation for protein translation
Sources:Amigo / QuickGO
Orthologs
Databases	NCBI: entry; OMA: entry
Species	Human	Mouse
Entrez	79731	244141
Ensembl	ENSG00000137513	ENSMUSG00000018995
UniProt	Q96I59	Q8BGV0
RefSeq (mRNA)	NM_001243251; NM_024678	NM_153591
RefSeq (protein)	NP_001230180; NP_078954	NP_705819
Location (UCSC)	Chr 11: 78.44 – 78.57 Mb	Chr 7: 96.6 – 96.71 Mb
PubMed search
- Wikidata
View/Edit Human	View/Edit Mouse

Asparagine–tRNA ligase, mitochondrial, also called asparaginyl-tRNA synthetase 2, is an enzyme that in humans is encoded by the NARS2 gene. Like its cytoplasmic relative, NARS1, this enzyme is an asparagine–tRNA ligase which functions to attach the amino acid asparagine to its corresponding transfer RNA (denoted tRNA^{Asn}), whose product is part of RNA-to-protein translation.

== Medical Significance ==
Pathogenic variants in the gene NARS2 are associated with mitochondrial dysfunction, called combined oxidative phosphorylation deficiency-24 (COXPD24). Symptoms vary significantly between people, but often start in infancy, and include nervous system issues such as seizures, hearing impairment, and low muscle tone (hypotonia). People with more severe symptoms may have brain abnormalities that are visible on imaging and consistent with Leigh syndrome. Inheritance seems to follow an autosomal recessive pattern. Other symptoms in those with pathogenic mutations have also been reported, including neonatal diabetes and isolated deafness.

== See also ==
- Aminoacyl tRNA synthetase
