= Valine–tRNA ligase, mitochondrial =

Enzyme found in humans

VARS2

Identifiers
- Aliases: VARS2, COXPD20, VALRS, VARS2L, VARSL, valyl-tRNA synthetase 2, mitochondrial
- External IDs: OMIM: 612802; MGI: 1916165; GeneCards: VARS2
Enzyme activity
| EC # | BRENDA | ExPASy | KEGG | MetaCyc |
|---|---|---|---|---|
| 6.1.1.9 | ↗ | ↗ | ↗ | ↗ |

Gene location (Human)
| Chr. | Chromosome 6 (human) |
| Band | 6p21.33 | Start | 30,914,205 bp |
| Band | 6p21.33 | End | 30,926,459 bp |

Gene location (Mouse)
| Chr. | Chromosome 17 (mouse) |
| Band | 17|17 B1 | Start | 35,966,526 bp |
| Band | 17|17 B1 | End | 35,978,484 bp |
RNA expression pattern
| Bgee | Human / Mouse (ortholog); Top expressed in: right hemisphere of cerebellum; ventricular zone; ganglionic eminence; apex of heart; right frontal lobe; right lobe of liver; sural nerve; caudate nucleus; nucleus accumbens; putamen / Top expressed in: zygote; epithelium of stomach; otic vesicle; neural layer of retina; thymus; hand; secondary oocyte; ventricular zone; epiblast; superior frontal gyrus; More reference expression data |
| BioGPS | n/a |
Gene ontology
| Molecular function | aminoacyl-tRNA ligase activity; nucleotide binding; valine-tRNA ligase activity; ligase activity; protein binding; ATP binding; aminoacyl-tRNA editing activity |
| Cellular component | mitochondrion; cytosol |
| Biological process | protein biosynthesis; tRNA aminoacylation for protein translation; valyl-tRNA aminoacylation; aminoacyl-tRNA metabolism involved in translational fidelity |
Sources:Amigo / QuickGO
Orthologs
| Databases | NCBI: entry; OMA: entry |
| Species | Human | Mouse |
| Entrez | 57176 | 68915 |
| Ensembl | ENSG00000137411; ENSG00000206476; ENSG00000234032; ENSG00000230985; ENSG00000236178 ENSG00000223494 | ENSMUSG00000038838 |
| UniProt | Q5ST30 | Q3U2A8 |
| RefSeq (mRNA) | NM_020442; NM_001167733; NM_001167734 | NM_175137 |
| RefSeq (protein) | NP_001161205; NP_001161206; NP_065175 | NP_780346 |
| Location (UCSC) | Chr 6: 30.91 – 30.93 Mb | Chr 17: 35.97 – 35.98 Mb |
| PubMed search |
- Wikidata
| View/Edit Human | View/Edit Mouse |

Valine–tRNA ligase, mitochondrial, also called Valyl-tRNA synthetase 2, mitochondrial, is a protein that in humans is encoded by the VARS2 gene. Like the related enzyme VARS1, this enzyme functions as a valine–tRNA ligase.

== Function ==
This gene encodes a mitochondrial aminoacyl-tRNA synthetase, which catalyzes the attachment of valine to tRNA(Val) for mitochondrial translation. Mutations in this gene cause combined oxidative phosphorylation deficiency-20, and are also associated with early-onset mitochondrial encephalopathies. Alternative splicing of this gene results in multiple transcript variants. [provided by RefSeq, Aug 2014].

== Medical significance ==
Pathogenic (homozygous or compound heterozygous) mutations in VARS2 are associated with dysfunction of oxidative phosphorylation (an important part of cellular energy production), leading to diverse symptoms, and called combined oxidative phosphorylation deficiency-20 (COXPD20).
