= Arginine–tRNA ligase =

Identifiers
- EC no.: 6.1.1.19
- CAS no.: 37205-35-9

Databases
- BRENDA: enzyme data
- ExPASy: NiceZyme view
- KEGG: enzyme entry
- MetaCyc: metabolic pathway
- Rhea: reactions
- PDB structures: RCSB PDB PDBe PDBsum
- Gene Ontology: AmiGO / QuickGO
Search
- PMC: articles
- PubMed: articles
- NCBI: proteins

Arginyl tRNA synthetase N terminal domain
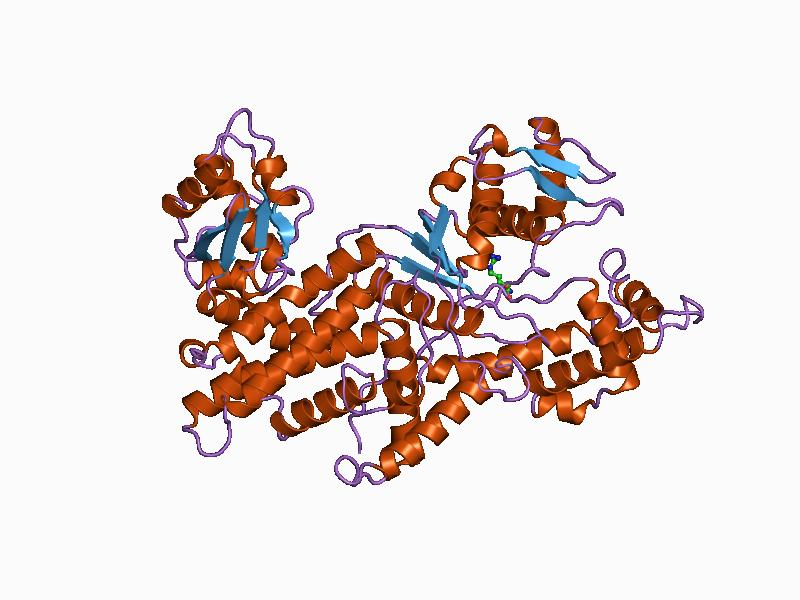
- yeast arginyl-trna synthetase

Identifiers
- Symbol: Arg_tRNA_synt_N
- Pfam: PF03485
- InterPro: IPR005148
- SCOP2: 1f7u / SCOPe / SUPFAM
Available protein structures:
- PDB: IPR005148 PF03485 (ECOD; PDBsum)
- AlphaFold: IPR005148; PF03485

In enzymology, an arginine–tRNA ligase (EC 6.1.1.19) is an enzyme that catalyzes the chemical reaction

ATP + L-arginine + tRNA^{Arg} $\rightleftharpoons$ AMP + diphosphate + L-arginyl-tRNA^{Arg}

The 3 substrates of this enzyme are ATP, L-arginine, and tRNA^{Arg}, whereas its 3 products are AMP, diphosphate, and L-arginyl-tRNA^{Arg}.

This enzyme belongs to the family of ligases, to be specific those forming carbon–oxygen bonds in aminoacyl-tRNA and related compounds. The systematic name of this enzyme class is L-arginine:tRNA^{Arg} ligase (AMP-forming). Other names in common use include arginyl-tRNA synthetase, arginyl-transfer ribonucleate synthetase, arginyl-transfer RNA synthetase, arginyl transfer ribonucleic acid synthetase, arginine-tRNA synthetase, and arginine translase. This enzyme participates in arginine and proline metabolism and aminoacyl-tRNA biosynthesis.

It contains a conserved domain at the N-terminus called arginyl-tRNA synthetase N-terminal domain or additional domain 1 (Add-1). This domain is about 140 residues long and it has been suggested that it is involved in tRNA recognition.

== Structural studies ==
As of late 2007, 4 structures have been solved for this class of enzymes, with PDB accession codes PDB: 1BS2, PDB: 1F7U, PDB: 1F7V, and PDB: 1IQ0.
