= Glu-AdT subunit C =

Protein found in humans

GATC

Identifiers
- Aliases: GATC, 15E1.2, glutamyl-tRNA(Gln) amidotransferase, subunit C, glutamyl-tRNA amidotransferase subunit C, COXPD42
- External IDs: OMIM: 617210; MGI: 1923776; GeneCards: GATC

Gene location (Human)
Chr.	Chromosome 12 (human)
Band	12q24.31	Start	120,446,444 bp
Band	12q24.31	End	120,463,749 bp

Gene location (Mouse)
Chr.	Chromosome 5 (mouse)
Band	5|5 F	Start	115,471,298 bp
Band	5|5 F	End	115,479,237 bp
RNA expression pattern
Bgee	Human / Mouse (ortholog); Top expressed in: tendon of biceps brachii; internal globus pallidus; renal medulla; pars reticulata; middle temporal gyrus; inferior ganglion of vagus nerve; pars compacta; lateral nuclear group of thalamus; endothelial cell; Brodmann area 23 / Top expressed in: neural layer of retina; interventricular septum; muscle of thigh; tail of embryo; genital tubercle; ventricular zone; Rostral migratory stream; right kidney; sternocleidomastoid muscle; triceps brachii muscle; More reference expression data
BioGPS	n/a
Gene ontology
Molecular function	nucleotide binding; ligase activity; protein binding; ATP binding; glutaminyl-tRNA synthase (glutamine-hydrolyzing) activity; carbon-nitrogen ligase activity, with glutamine as amido-N-donor
Cellular component	mitochondrion; glutamyl-tRNA(Gln) amidotransferase complex
Biological process	regulation of translational fidelity; protein biosynthesis; mitochondrial translation; glutaminyl-tRNAGln biosynthesis via transamidation
Sources:Amigo / QuickGO
Orthologs
Databases	NCBI: entry; OMA: entry
Species	Human	Mouse
Entrez	283459	384281
Ensembl	ENSG00000257218	ENSMUSG00000029536
UniProt	O43716	Q8CBY0
RefSeq (mRNA)	NM_176818	NM_029645
RefSeq (protein)	NP_789788	NP_083921
Location (UCSC)	Chr 12: 120.45 – 120.46 Mb	Chr 5: 115.47 – 115.48 Mb
PubMed search
- Wikidata
View/Edit Human	View/Edit Mouse

Glutamyl-tRNA(Gln) amidotransferase subunit C, mitochondrial (or Glu-AdT subunit C) is a protein that in humans is encoded by the GATC gene. The gene is also known as 15E1.2 and encodes part of a Glu-tRNA(Gln) amidotransferase enzyme, which converts (mischarged) glutamyl-tRNA^{Gln} to glutaminyl-tRNA^{Gln} as part of protein synthesis in the mitochondria.

== Medical significance ==
Like with subunit A, mutations in GATC are associated with mitochondrial disease. This recessive disorder is called combined oxidative phosphorylation deficiency-42 (COXPD42), and symptoms include cardiovascular dysfunction, anemia, and early death.
