= Glutamate–tRNA ligase =

Class of enzymes

Identifiers
- EC no.: 6.1.1.17
- CAS no.: 9068-76-2

Databases
- BRENDA: enzyme data
- ExPASy: NiceZyme view
- KEGG: enzyme entry
- MetaCyc: metabolic pathway
- Rhea: reactions
- PDB structures: RCSB PDB PDBe PDBsum
- Gene Ontology: AmiGO / QuickGO
Search
- PMC: articles
- PubMed: articles
- NCBI: proteins

In enzymology, a glutamate–tRNA ligase (EC 6.1.1.17) is an enzyme that catalyzes the chemical reaction

ATP + L-glutamate + tRNA^{Glu} $\rightleftharpoons$ AMP + diphosphate + L-glutamyl-tRNA^{Glu}

The 3 substrates of this enzyme are ATP, L-glutamate, and tRNA^{Glu}, whereas its 3 products are AMP, diphosphate, and L-glutamyl-tRNA^{Glu}.

This enzyme belongs to the family of ligases, to be specific those forming carbon–oxygen bonds in aminoacyl-tRNA and related compounds. The systematic name of this enzyme class is L-glutamate:tRNA^{Glu} ligase (AMP-forming). Other names in common use include glutamyl-tRNA synthetase, glutamyl-transfer ribonucleate synthetase, glutamyl-transfer RNA synthetase, glutamyl-transfer ribonucleic acid synthetase, glutamate-tRNA synthetase, and glutamic acid translase. This enzyme participates in 3 metabolic pathways: glutamate metabolism, porphyrin and chlorophyll metabolism, and aminoacyl-tRNA biosynthesis.

== Structural studies ==
As of late 2007, 16 structures have been solved for this class of enzymes, with PDB accession codes PDB: 1FYJ, PDB: 1G59, PDB: 1J09, PDB: 1N75, PDB: 1N77, PDB: 1N78, PDB: 2CFO, PDB: 2CUZ, PDB: 2CV0, PDB: 2CV1, PDB: 2CV2, PDB: 2DXI, PDB: 2HRA, PDB: 2HRK, PDB: 2HSM, and PDB: 2O5R.
