= QARS1 =

Protein-coding gene in the species Homo sapiens

Identifiers
- Aliases: QARS1, GLNRS, MSCCA, PRO2195, glutaminyl-tRNA synthetase, glutaminyl-tRNA synthetase 1, QARS
- External IDs: OMIM: 603727; MGI: 1915851; GeneCards: QARS1
Available structures
PDB	Ortholog search: PDBe RCSB
PDB	List of PDB id codes 4R3Z, 4YE9, 4YE6, 4YE8
Enzyme activity
EC #	BRENDA	ExPASy	KEGG	MetaCyc
6.1.1.18	↗	↗	↗	↗

Gene location (Human)
Chr.	Chromosome 3 (human)
Band	3p21.31	Start	49,095,932 bp
Band	3p21.31	End	49,105,130 bp

Gene location (Mouse)
Chr.	Chromosome 9 (mouse)
Band	9|9 F2	Start	108,384,905 bp
Band	9|9 F2	End	108,393,140 bp
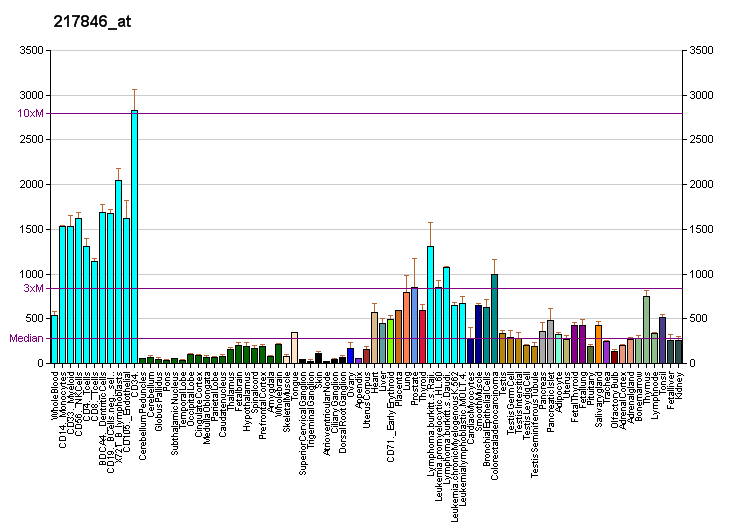
RNA expression pattern
Bgee	Human / Mouse (ortholog); Top expressed in: vulva; skin of arm; gonad; mucosa of sigmoid colon; tonsil; gums; skin of thigh; gingival epithelium; palpebral conjunctiva; rectum / Top expressed in: seminal vesicula; external carotid artery; internal carotid artery; hair follicle; parotid gland; primary oocyte; lacrimal gland; transitional epithelium of urinary bladder; submandibular gland; condyle; More reference expression data
BioGPS	More reference expression data
Gene ontology
Molecular function	aminoacyl-tRNA ligase activity; nucleotide binding; ligase activity; protein binding; ATP binding; protein kinase inhibitor activity; protein kinase binding; glutamine-tRNA ligase activity
Cellular component	cytoplasm; mitochondrial matrix; aminoacyl-tRNA synthetase multienzyme complex; cytosol; protein-containing complex
Biological process	brain development; glutaminyl-tRNA aminoacylation; tRNA aminoacylation; protein biosynthesis; tRNA aminoacylation for protein translation; negative regulation of protein kinase activity; negative regulation of stress-activated MAPK cascade; negative regulation of transcription, DNA-templated; negative regulation of apoptotic signaling pathway
Sources:Amigo / QuickGO
Orthologs
Databases	NCBI: entry; OMA: entry
Species	Human	Mouse
Entrez	5859	97541
Ensembl	ENSG00000172053	ENSMUSG00000032604
UniProt	P47897	Q8BML9
RefSeq (mRNA)	NM_001272073; NM_005051	NM_001168270; NM_133794
RefSeq (protein)	NP_001259002; NP_005042	NP_598555
Location (UCSC)	Chr 3: 49.1 – 49.11 Mb	Chr 9: 108.38 – 108.39 Mb
PubMed search
- Wikidata
View/Edit Human	View/Edit Mouse

Glutamine–tRNA ligase, also called glutaminyl-tRNA synthetase 1, is an enzyme that in humans is encoded by the QARS1 gene (previously QARS). More broadly, Glutamate–tRNA ligase (EC 6.1.1.18) can also refer to the type of enzyme activity that the QARS1 protein performs, namely catalyzing the attachment of the amino acid glutamine to transfer RNA using ATP.

== Function ==
Aminoacyl-tRNA synthetases catalyze the aminoacylation of tRNA by their cognate amino acid. Because of their central role in linking amino acids with nucleotide triplets contained in tRNAs, aminoacyl-tRNA synthetases are thought to be among the first proteins that appeared in evolution. In metazoans, 9 aminoacyl-tRNA synthetases specific for glutamine (gln), glutamic acid (glu), and 7 other amino acids are associated within a multienzyme complex. Although present in eukaryotes, glutaminyl-tRNA synthetase (QARS) is absent from many prokaryotes, mitochondria, and chloroplasts, in which Gln-tRNA(Gln) is formed by transamidation of the misacylated Glu-tRNA(Gln). Glutaminyl-tRNA synthetase belongs to the class-I aminoacyl-tRNA synthetase family. Almost all eukaryotic GlnRS enzymes possess a YqeY domain at the N-terminus, which affects affinity for the tRNA; in some bacterial species, such as Deinococcus radiodurans, YqeY is present as a C-terminal domain with similar function.

== Medical significance ==
Pathogenic (compound heterozygous) mutations in QARS1 have been associated with a brain development disorder leading to an unusually small head and brain (microcephaly) among other symptoms called progressive microcephaly with seizures and cerebral and cerebellar atrophy (MSCCA).

== Interactions ==
QARS1 has been shown to interact with RARS1.
