= EPRS1 =

Protein-coding gene in humans

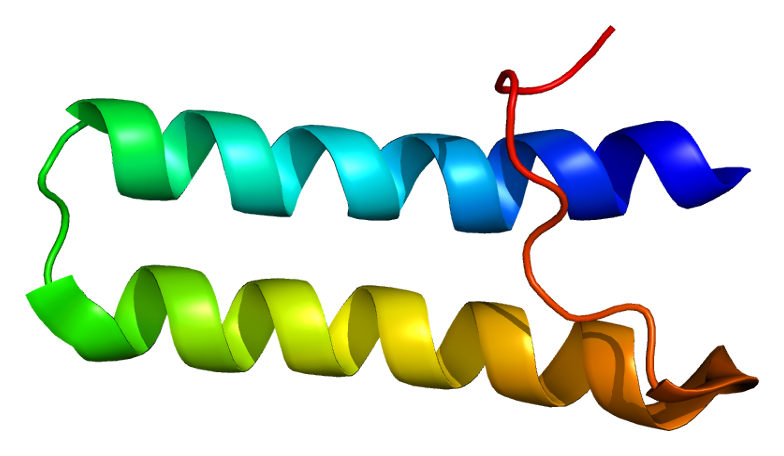

Identifiers
- Aliases: EPRS1, EARS, GLUPRORS, PARS, QARS, QPRS, PIG32, glutamyl-prolyl-tRNA synthetase, HLD15, glutamyl-prolyl-tRNA synthetase 1, EPRS
- External IDs: OMIM: 138295; MGI: 97838; GeneCards: EPRS1
Available structures
PDB	Ortholog search: PDBe RCSB
PDB	List of PDB id codes 1FYJ, 4HVC, 4K86, 4K87, 4K88, 5A34, 5BMU, 5A1N, 5A5H
Enzyme activity
EC #	BRENDA	ExPASy	KEGG	MetaCyc
6.1.1.15	↗	↗	↗	↗
6.1.1.17	↗	↗	↗	↗

Gene location (Human)
Chr.	Chromosome 1 (human)
Band	1q41	Start	219,968,600 bp
Band	1q41	End	220,046,530 bp

Gene location (Mouse)
Chr.	Chromosome 1 (mouse)
Band	1|1 H5	Start	185,095,241 bp
Band	1|1 H5	End	185,160,557 bp
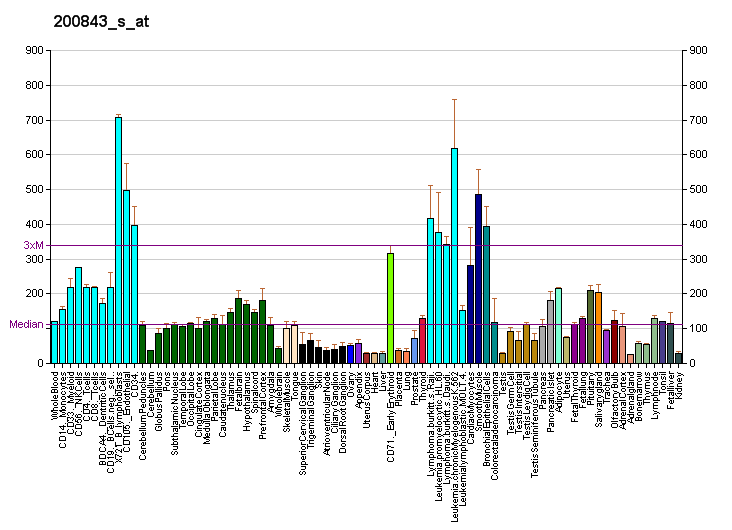
RNA expression pattern
Bgee	Human / Mouse (ortholog); Top expressed in: parotid gland; optic nerve; secondary oocyte; Achilles tendon; lateral nuclear group of thalamus; ventricular zone; tibia; islet of Langerhans; external globus pallidus; Brodmann area 23 / Top expressed in: otic placode; Rostral migratory stream; parotid gland; saccule; maxillary prominence; human fetus; mandibular prominence; tail of embryo; genital tubercle; otic vesicle; More reference expression data
BioGPS	More reference expression data
Gene ontology
Molecular function	nucleotide binding; protein binding; RNA stem-loop binding; ATP binding; catalytic activity; ligase activity; aminoacyl-tRNA ligase activity; GTPase binding; RNA binding; glutamate-tRNA ligase activity; proline-tRNA ligase activity; zinc ion binding; protein homodimerization activity; metal ion binding; identical protein binding
Cellular component	membrane; GAIT complex; cytoplasm; aminoacyl-tRNA synthetase multienzyme complex; cytosol; plasma membrane; ribonucleoprotein complex
Biological process	regulation of translation; tRNA aminoacylation; metabolism; protein biosynthesis; tRNA aminoacylation for protein translation; negative regulation of translation; cellular response to interferon-gamma; glutamyl-tRNA aminoacylation; prolyl-tRNA aminoacylation; cellular response to insulin stimulus; long-chain fatty acid import into cell; protein-containing complex assembly; regulation of long-chain fatty acid import into cell
Sources:Amigo / QuickGO
Orthologs
Databases	NCBI: entry; OMA: entry
Species	Human	Mouse
Entrez	2058	107508
Ensembl	ENSG00000136628	ENSMUSG00000026615
UniProt	P07814	Q8CGC7
RefSeq (mRNA)	NM_004446	NM_029735; NM_001357474
RefSeq (protein)	NP_004437	NP_084011; NP_001344403
Location (UCSC)	Chr 1: 219.97 – 220.05 Mb	Chr 1: 185.1 – 185.16 Mb
PubMed search
- Wikidata
View/Edit Human	View/Edit Mouse

Bifunctional glutamate/proline--tRNA ligase, also called bifunctional aminoacyl-tRNA synthetase, is an enzyme that in humans is encoded by the EPRS1 gene (previously EPRS). This enzyme is located in the cytoplasm, where it attaches the amino acids glutamate and proline to their corresponding transfer RNA (tRNA^{Glu} and tRNA^{Pro}) as part of RNA-to-protein translation.

== Gene ==
Alternative splicing has been observed for this gene, but the full-length nature and biological validity of the variant have not been determined.

== Function ==
Aminoacyl-tRNA synthetases are a class of enzymes that charge tRNAs with their cognate amino acids. The protein encoded by this gene is a multifunctional aminoacyl-tRNA synthetase that catalyzes the aminoacylation of glutamic acid and proline tRNA species.

Phosphorylation of EPRS is reported to be essential for the formation of GAIT (Gamma-interferon Activated Inhibitor of Translation) complex that regulates the translation of multiple genes in monocytes and macrophages.

EPRS1 acts, in human cells, as a proviral factor in mammarenaviruses infection, including LCMV, JUNV, and LASV, and its inhibition using halofuginon compound, a prolyl domain inhibitor, completely abolishes the viral infection by interrupting viral assembly and budding.

== Interactions ==
EPRS has been shown to interact with POU2F1, Heat shock protein 90kDa alpha (cytosolic), member A1 and IARS.

== Medical significance ==
Pathogenic mutations in EPRS1 are associated with a type of disorder of the neural white matter (Leukodystrophy) which is called hypomyelinating leukodystrophy-15 (HLD15).
