= EARS2 =

Protein-coding gene found in humans

Identifiers
- Aliases: EARS2, COXPD12, MSE1, gluRS, glutamyl-tRNA synthetase 2, mitochondrial, mtGlnRS
- External IDs: OMIM: 612799; MGI: 1914667; GeneCards: EARS2
Enzyme activity
EC #	BRENDA	ExPASy	KEGG	MetaCyc
6.1.1.17	↗	↗	↗	↗
6.1.1.24	↗	↗	↗	↗

Gene location (Human)
Chr.	Chromosome 16 (human)
Band	16p12.2	Start	23,520,754 bp
Band	16p12.2	End	23,557,731 bp

Gene location (Mouse)
Chr.	Chromosome 7 (mouse)
Band	7|7 F2	Start	121,636,436 bp
Band	7|7 F2	End	121,666,486 bp
RNA expression pattern
Bgee	Human / Mouse (ortholog); Top expressed in: right lobe of liver; gonad; right adrenal gland; right adrenal cortex; left adrenal gland; apex of heart; left adrenal cortex; left ventricle; rectum; gastrocnemius muscle / Top expressed in: atrioventricular valve; proximal tubule; endocardial cushion; right kidney; epiblast; tail of embryo; ventricular zone; embryo; ventricle of the heart; Rostral migratory stream; More reference expression data
BioGPS	n/a
Gene ontology
Molecular function	aminoacyl-tRNA ligase activity; tRNA binding; nucleotide binding; ligase activity; glutamate-tRNA ligase activity; ATP binding; glutamate-tRNA(Gln) ligase activity; zinc ion binding; RNA binding
Cellular component	cytoplasm; mitochondrial matrix; mitochondrion
Biological process	tRNA aminoacylation for mitochondrial protein translation; tRNA aminoacylation; protein biosynthesis; glutamyl-tRNA aminoacylation; tRNA aminoacylation for protein translation
Sources:Amigo / QuickGO
Orthologs
Databases	NCBI: entry; OMA: entry
Species	Human	Mouse
Entrez	124454	67417
Ensembl	ENSG00000103356	ENSMUSG00000030871
UniProt	Q5JPH6	Q9CXJ1
RefSeq (mRNA)	NM_001083614; NM_001308211	NM_026140
RefSeq (protein)	NP_001077083; NP_001295140	NP_080416
Location (UCSC)	Chr 16: 23.52 – 23.56 Mb	Chr 7: 121.64 – 121.67 Mb
PubMed search
- Wikidata
View/Edit Human	View/Edit Mouse

Glutamyl-tRNA synthetase 2, mitochondrial is an enzyme that in humans is encoded by the EARS2 gene. The enzyme EARS2 functions as part of the processes that incorporate the amino acids glutamate and glutamine into proteins during mitochondrial protein synthesis.

== Function ==
This non-discriminating enzyme functions to attach glutamate either to its corresponding transfer RNA, tRNA^{Glu}, or to glutamine's, tRNA^{Gln}. In the case of glutamate being mischarged to tRNA^{Gln}, the glutamate is converted into a glutamine by the enzyme Glu-tRNA^{Gln} amidotransferase (EC 6.3.5.7) before it can be incorporated into a protein during RNA-to-protein translation.

== Medical Significance ==
Pathogenic (homozygous or compound heterozygous) mutations in EARS2 are associated with dysfunction in the mitochondria, leading to severe muscle and neurological symptoms, called combined oxidative phosphorylation deficiency-12 (COXPD12).

== See also ==
- Glutamate—tRNA(Gln) ligase
