= C9H14N2O6 =

The molecular formula C_{9}H_{14}N_{2}O_{6} may refer to:

- Dihydrouridine
- 2-(β-D-Glucopyranosyl)-5-methyl-1,3,4-oxadiazole
