= QueA RNA motif =

queA
- Consensus secondary structure and sequence conservation of queA RNA

Identifiers
- Symbol: queA
- Rfam: RF03093

Other data
- RNA type: Gene; sRNA
- SO: SO:0001263
- PDB structures: PDBe

The queA RNA motif is a conserved RNA structure that was discovered by bioinformatics. queA motif RNAs have not yet (as of 2018) been found in any classified organism; they are known from metagenomic sequences.

All known queA RNAs are located upstream of queA genes, which encodes an enzyme to alter the chemical structure of a specific nucleotide within tRNAs. It is possible that queA RNAs function as cis-regulatory elements. PreQ_{1} riboswitches are known that bind pre-queuosine1 and regulate genes that are related to queA. However, as the que RNA motif is not highly conserved and the queA gene itself is never known to be regulated by a preQ_{1} riboswitch, it is not likely that queA RNAs correspond to riboswitches.
