= TRNA transglycosylase =

TRNA transglycosylase may refer to:

- TRNA-guanine15 transglycosylase, an enzyme
- Queuine tRNA-ribosyltransferase, an enzyme
