= B5 protein domain =

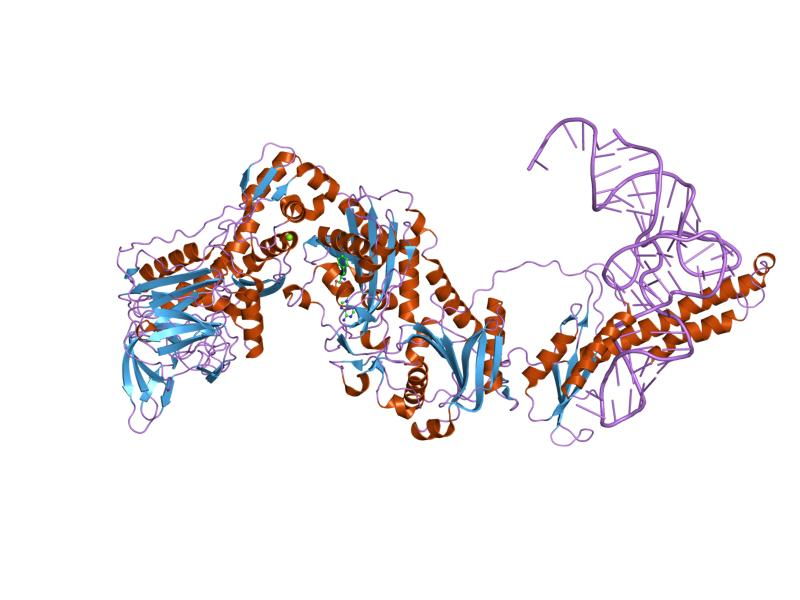
- Phenylalanyl-tRNA synthetase from Thermus thermophilus complexed with tRNA and a phenylalanyl-adenylate analog

Identifiers
- Symbol: B5
- Pfam: PF03484
- InterPro: IPR005147
- PROSITE: PDOC00464
- SCOP2: 1qq3 / SCOPe / SUPFAM
- TCDB: 5.A.4
Available protein structures:
- PDB: IPR005147 PF03484 (ECOD; PDBsum)
- AlphaFold: IPR005147; PF03484

In molecular biology, Domain B5 is found in phenylalanine-tRNA synthetase beta subunits. This domain has been shown to bind DNA through a winged helix-turn-helix motif. Phenylalanine-tRNA synthetase may influence common cellular processes via DNA binding, in addition to its aminoacylation function.

== Function ==
The beta domain, in particular, B3/B4, is required for the correct amino acid to be joined to the corresponding tRNA. Hence, the B3/B4 domain is crucial to accurate translation. Failure to do so, results in a mutated protein which improperly folds and consequently protein function is affected. /B
