= TRNA-dihydrouridine synthase =

Dihydrouridine synthase (Dus)
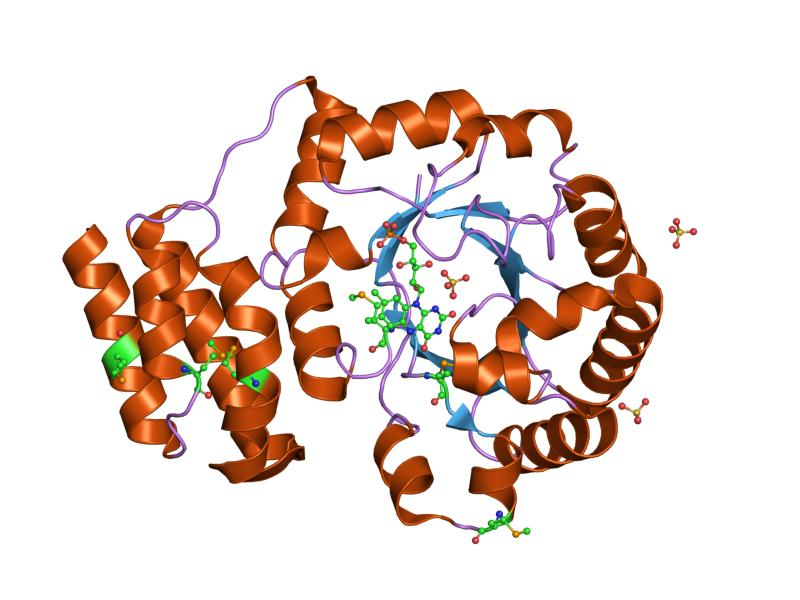
- crystal structure of a putative flavin oxidoreductase with flavin

Identifiers
- Symbol: Dus
- Pfam: PF01207
- Pfam clan: CL0036
- InterPro: IPR001269
- PROSITE: PDOC00874
- SCOP2: 1vhn / SCOPe / SUPFAM
Available protein structures:
- PDB: IPR001269 PF01207 (ECOD; PDBsum)
- AlphaFold: IPR001269; PF01207

In molecular biology, tRNA-dihydrouridine synthase is a family of enzymes which catalyse the reduction of the 5,6-double bond of a uridine residue on tRNA. Dihydrouridine modification of tRNA is widely observed in prokaryotes and eukaryotes, and also in some archaea. Most dihydrouridines are found in the D loop of t-RNAs. The role of dihydrouridine in tRNA is currently unknown, but may increase conformational flexibility of the tRNA. It is likely that different family members have different substrate specificities, which may overlap. Dus 1 from Saccharomyces cerevisiae (Baker's yeast) acts on pre-tRNA-Phe, while Dus 2 acts on pre-tRNA-Tyr and pre-tRNA-Leu. Dus 1 is active as a single subunit, requiring NADPH or NADH, and is stimulated by the presence of FAD. Some family members may be targeted to the mitochondria and even have a role in mitochondria.
