= C5H8N2O2 =

The molecular formula C_{5}H_{8}N_{2}O_{2} (molar mass: 128.131 g/mol, exact mass: 128.059 u) may refer to:

- Dihydrothymine
- 5,5-Dimethylhydantoin
