= PreQ1-III riboswitch =

Consensus secondary structure of PreQ_{1}-III riboswitches, based on earlier data than a previously published depiction. The structural significance of the pairing interaction labeled "pseudoknot or alternate stem" is currently unknown. The P1 stem is unusually rich in A and U nucleotides, but is supported by experimental data.

PreQ1-III riboswitches are a class of riboswitches that bind pre-queuosine_{1} (PreQ_{1}), a precursor to the modified nucleoside queuosine. PreQ_{1}-III riboswitches are the third class of riboswitches to be discovered that sense this ligand, and are structurally distinct from preQ_{1}-I and preQ_{1}-II riboswitches. Most sequenced examples of preQ_{1}-III riboswitches are obtained from uncultivated metagenome samples, but the few examples in cultivated organisms are present in strains that are known to or suspected to be Faecalibacterium prausnitzii, a species of Gram-positive Clostridia. Known examples of preQ_{1}-III riboswitches are found upstream of queT genes, which are expected to encode transporters of a queuosine derivative. The other two known classes of preQ_{1} riboswitches are also commonly found upstream of queT genes.

The atomic-resolution structure of a preQ1-III riboswitch has been solved by X-ray crystallography.
