= LGTN =

Protein-coding gene in humans

EIF2D

Identifiers
- Aliases: EIF2D, HCA56, LGTN, eukaryotic translation initiation factor 2D
- External IDs: OMIM: 613709; MGI: 109342; GeneCards: EIF2D

Gene location (Human)
Chr.	Chromosome 1 (human)
Band	1q32.1	Start	206,571,292 bp
Band	1q32.1	End	206,612,465 bp

Gene location (Mouse)
Chr.	Chromosome 1 (mouse)
Band	1 E4|1 56.9 cM	Start	131,080,918 bp
Band	1 E4|1 56.9 cM	End	131,115,395 bp
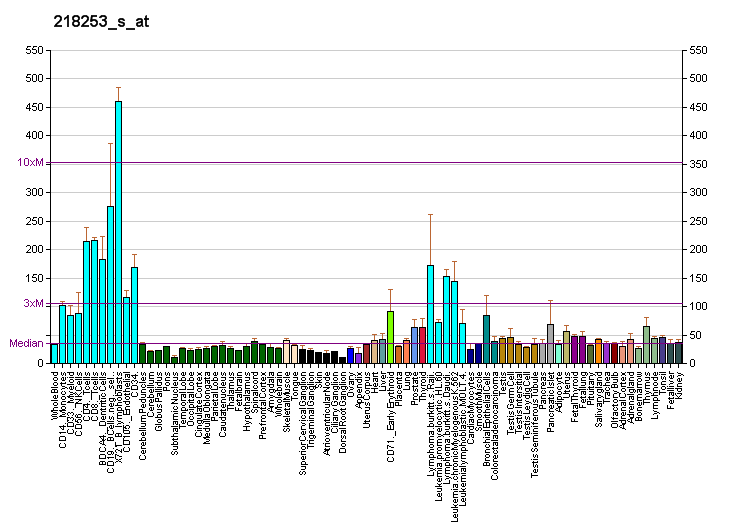
RNA expression pattern
Bgee	Human / Mouse (ortholog); Top expressed in: left ovary; body of uterus; right ovary; right uterine tube; glutes; muscle of thigh; parotid gland; body of pancreas; muscle layer of sigmoid colon; canal of the cervix / Top expressed in: Paneth cell; fossa; condyle; hair follicle; internal carotid artery; lacrimal gland; primitive streak; external carotid artery; endothelial cell of lymphatic vessel; epiblast; More reference expression data
BioGPS	More reference expression data
Gene ontology
Molecular function	translation initiation factor activity; RNA binding; signaling receptor activity
Cellular component	cytoplasm; cytosolic small ribosomal subunit; cytosol; nuclear body
Biological process	translational initiation; intracellular protein transport; ribosome disassembly; protein biosynthesis; formation of translation preinitiation complex; IRES-dependent viral translational initiation; signal transduction
Sources:Amigo / QuickGO
Orthologs
Databases	NCBI: entry; OMA: entry
Species	Human	Mouse
Entrez	1939	16865
Ensembl	ENSG00000143486	ENSMUSG00000026427
UniProt	P41214; Q5SY38	Q61211
RefSeq (mRNA)	NM_001201478; NM_006893	NM_001136070; NM_010709
RefSeq (protein)	NP_001188407; NP_008824	NP_001129542; NP_034839
Location (UCSC)	Chr 1: 206.57 – 206.61 Mb	Chr 1: 131.08 – 131.12 Mb
PubMed search
- Wikidata
View/Edit Human	View/Edit Mouse

Ligatin, otherwise known as eIF2D, is a protein that in humans is encoded by the LGTN gene. This protein is not a component of the heterotrimeric eIF2 complex, but instead functions in different pathways of eukaryotic translation.

== Function ==
This gene encodes a protein receptor that localizes phosphoglycoproteins within endosomes and at the cell periphery. This trafficking receptor for phosphoglycoproteins may play a role in neuroplasticity by modulating cell-cell interactions, intracellular adhesion, and protein binding at membrane surfaces. In hippocampal neurons, long-lasting down-regulation of ligation mRNA levels occurs via post-transcriptional RNA processing following glutamate receptor activation. This protein contains single PUA and SUI1 domains and these domains may function in RNA binding and translation initiation, respectively.

== See also ==
- Eukaryotic translation
- Eukaryotic initiation factor
