= TRNA-guanine15 transglycosylase =

Class of enzymes

Identifiers
- EC no.: 2.4.2.48

Databases
- IntEnz: IntEnz view
- BRENDA: BRENDA entry
- ExPASy: NiceZyme view
- KEGG: KEGG entry
- MetaCyc: metabolic pathway
- PRIAM: profile
- PDB structures: RCSB PDB PDBe PDBsum
Search
- PMC: articles
- PubMed: articles
- NCBI: proteins

TRNA-guanine15 transglycosylase (EC 2.4.2.48, tRNA transglycosylase, transfer ribonucleate glycosyltransferase, tRNA guanine15 transglycosidase, TGT, transfer ribonucleic acid guanine15 transglycosylase) is an enzyme with systematic name tRNA-guanine15:7-cyano-7-carbaguanine tRNA-D-ribosyltransferase. This enzyme catalyses the following chemical reaction

guanine^{15} in tRNA + 7-cyano-7-carbaguanine $\rightleftharpoons$ 7-cyano-7-carbaguanine^{15} in tRNA + guanine

Archaeal tRNAs contain the modified nucleoside archaeosine at position 15.
