= PreQ1 synthase =

Identifiers
- EC no.: 1.7.1.13

Databases
- IntEnz: IntEnz view
- BRENDA: BRENDA entry
- ExPASy: NiceZyme view
- KEGG: KEGG entry
- MetaCyc: metabolic pathway
- PRIAM: profile
- PDB structures: RCSB PDB PDBe PDBsum
Search
- PMC: articles
- PubMed: articles
- NCBI: proteins

PreQ1 synthase (EC 1.7.1.13) is an enzyme that catalyzes the chemical reaction

7-cyano-7-deazaguanine
+ 2 NADPH
2 H^{+}
2 H^{+}
7-aminomethyl-7-deazaguanine
+ 2 NADP^{+}

The substrates of this enzyme are 7-cyano-7-deazaguanine, reduced nicotinamide adenine dinucleotide phosphate (NADPH), and two protons. Its products are 7-aminomethyl-7-deazaguanine and oxidised NADP^{+}.

This enzyme belongs to the family of oxidoreductases, specifically those acting on other nitrogenous compounds as donors with NAD+ or NADP+ as acceptor. The systematic name of this enzyme class is 7-aminomethyl-7-carbaguanine:NADP+ oxidoreductase. Other names in common use include YkvM, QueF, preQ0 reductase, preQ0 oxidoreductase, 7-cyano-7-deazaguanine reductase, 7-aminomethyl-7-carbaguanine:NADP+ oxidoreductase, queuine synthase and queuine:NADP+ oxidoreductase: (the last two are misleading as queuine is not the product). The enzyme is part of the biosynthetic pathway to modified nucleoside, queuosine. As of 2012, this was the only enzyme known to directly catalyze the reduction of a nitrile group to a primary amine.
