= C12H15N5O3 =

The molecular formula C_{12}H_{15}N_{5}O_{3} (molar mass: 277.28 g/mol, exact mass: 277.1175 u) may refer to:

- Entecavir (ETV)
- Queuine (Q)
