= Dihydropyrimidinase =

Class of enzymes

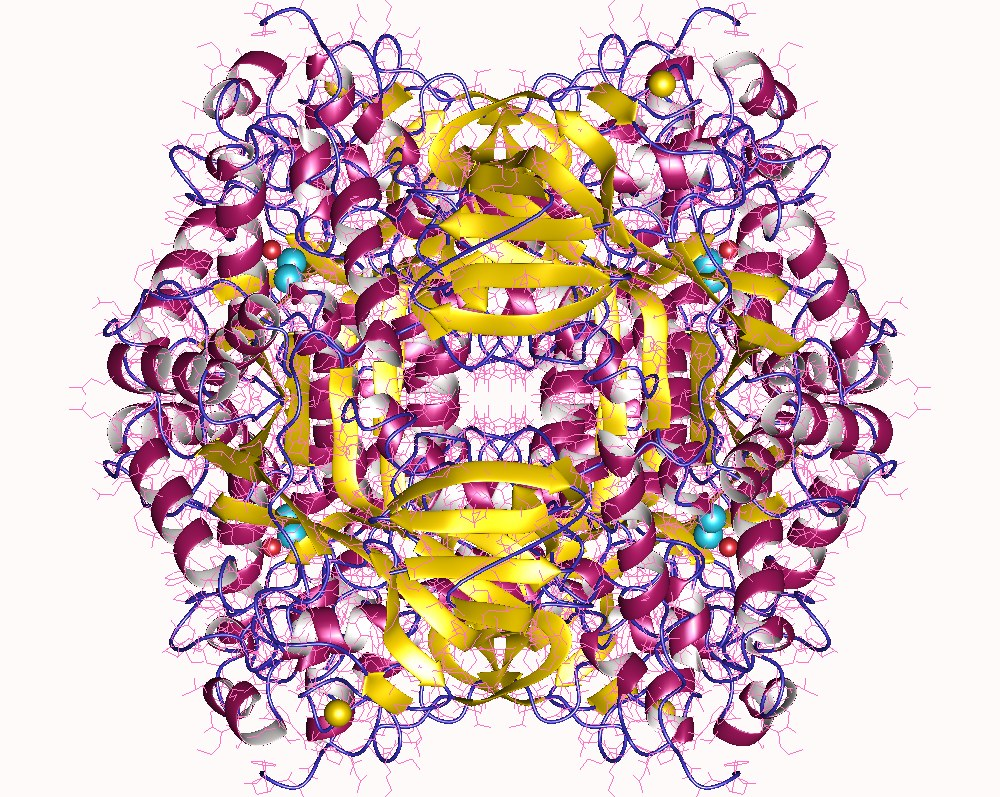
- Dihydropyrimidinase tetramer, Human

Identifiers
- EC no.: 3.5.2.2
- CAS no.: 9030-74-4

Databases
- BRENDA: enzyme data
- ExPASy: NiceZyme view
- KEGG: enzyme entry
- MetaCyc: metabolic pathway
- Rhea: reactions
- PDB structures: RCSB PDB PDBe PDBsum
- Gene Ontology: AmiGO / QuickGO
Search
- PMC: articles
- PubMed: articles
- NCBI: proteins

dihydropyrimidinase

Identifiers
- Symbol: DPYS
- NCBI gene: 1807
- HGNC: 3013
- OMIM: 613326
- RefSeq: NM_001385
- UniProt: Q14117

Other data
- Locus: Chr. 8 q22.3
Search for
- Structures: Swiss-model
- Domains: InterPro

Dihydropyrimidinase (EC 3.5.2.2) is an enzyme characterised from bovine liver that catalyzes the hydrolysis of dihydrouracil to 3-ureidopropionic acid: In humans, dihydropyrimidinase is encoded by the DPYS gene.

dihydrouracil
H_{2}O
H_{2}O
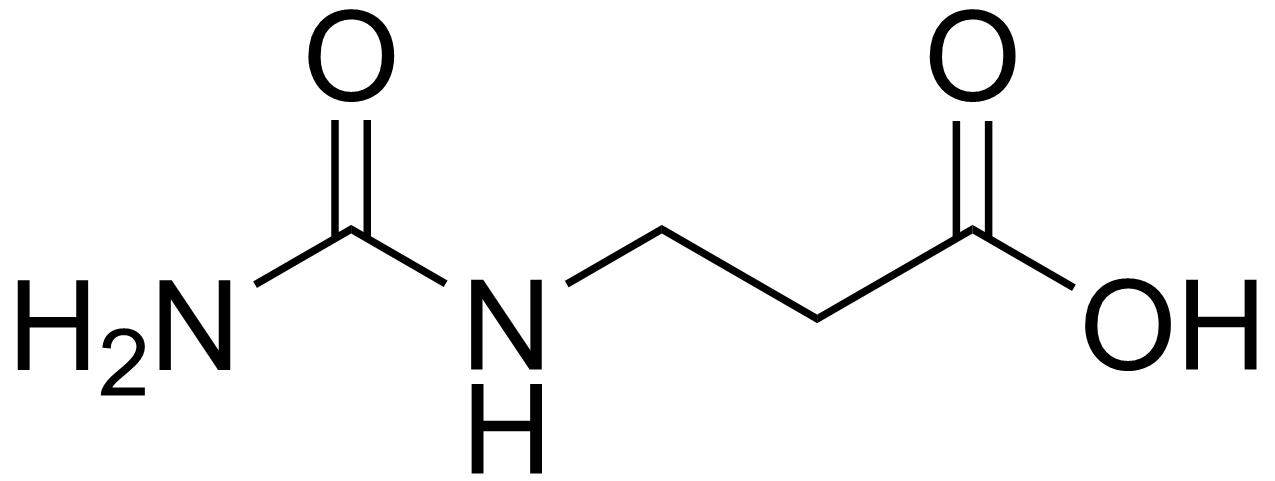
3-ureidopropionic acid

The enzyme also acts on dihydrothymine and these reactions are part of the catabolism of pyrimidines.

== Nomenclature ==
This enzyme is a hydrolase, one acting on carbon-nitrogen bonds other than peptide bonds, specifically in cyclic amides. The systematic name of this enzyme class is 5,6-dihydropyrimidine amidohydrolase. The following names are also in common use.

- hydantoinase
- hydropyrimidine hydrase
- hydantoin peptidase
- pyrimidine hydrase
- D-hydantoinase

== Structure ==
Dihydropyrimidinase belongs to the cyclic amidohydrolase family, which also includes allantoinase and dihydroorotase. Each subunit contains a TIM barrel that houses the metal-binding active site, together with a smaller β-sandwich domain. In the human crystal structure dihydropyrimidinase forms a homotetramer with two zinc ions per subunit.

== Clinical significance ==
Although a deficiency of the enzyme is rare in humans, it can lead to mental retardation and gastrointestinal problems.
