= TRNADB =

tRNAdb
Content
- Description: compilation of tRNA sequences and tRNA genes

Contact
- Laboratory: Universities of Leipzig, Marburg, and Strasbourg
- Primary citation: Juhling et al. (2009)

Access
- Website: Website

tRNAdb was a comprehensive biological database of transfer RNA (tRNA) sequences and tRNA genes. It originated as one of the first specialized compilations of nucleic acid sequences, starting as a print publication by Mathias Sprinzl in the late 1970s. It evolved into a web-based resource hosted at the University of Bayreuth and was later relaunched in 2009 as a more powerful relational database at the University of Leipzig. The database is now considered defunct, as the Leipzig-based resource is no longer active. Its role has largely been superseded by other modern tRNA databases.

== Related databases ==
=== tRNADB-CE ===
The tRNA Gene Database Curated by Experts (tRNADB-CE) is a database of tRNA genes developed and maintained by researchers at Niigata University and the Nagahama Institute of Bio-Science and Technology in Japan. A key feature of tRNADB-CE is its rigorous curation process. It uses three different tRNA gene prediction programs (tRNAscan-SE, ARAGORN, and tRNAfinder) and identifies any discordant results. These conflicting predictions are then manually reviewed by experts to ensure high accuracy.

=== GtRNAdb ===
The Genomic tRNA Database (GtRNAdb) is a database of tRNA genes found in complete and draft genomes. Hosted at the University of California, Santa Cruz (UCSC) and maintained by the laboratory of Todd Lowe, GtRNAdb is built using predictions from a single, highly accurate software tool, tRNAscan-SE. It provides detailed information on genomic location, isotype, and secondary structure, and it is tightly integrated with the UCSC Genome Browser. Its focus is on providing high-quality, automated annotations of tRNA genes across all domains of life.

== See also ==
- Transfer RNA (or tRNA)
- Transfer RNA-like structures
