= PreQ1 riboswitch =

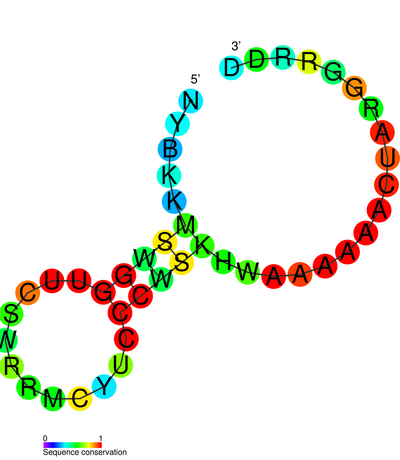
- Predicted secondary structure and sequence conservation of PreQ1

Identifiers
- Symbol: PreQ1
- Rfam: RF00522

Other data
- RNA type: Cis-reg; riboswitch
- Domain: Bacteria
- SO: SO:0000035
- PDB structures: PDBe 2L1V

The PreQ_{1}-I riboswitch is a cis-acting element identified in bacteria which regulates expression of genes involved in biosynthesis of the nucleoside queuosine (Q) from GTP. PreQ_{1} (pre-queuosine_{1}) is an intermediate in the queuosine pathway, and preQ_{1} riboswitch, as a type of riboswitch, is an RNA element that binds preQ_{1}. The preQ_{1} riboswitch is distinguished by its unusually small aptamer, compared to other riboswitches. Its atomic-resolution three-dimensional structure has been determined, with the PDB ID 2L1V.

== PreQ_{1} classification ==
Three subcategories of the PreQ_{1} riboswitch exist: preQ_{1}-I, preQ_{1}-II, and preQ_{1}-III. PreQ_{1}-I has a distinctly small aptamer, ranging from 25 to 45 nucleotides long, compared to the structures of PreQ_{1}-II riboswitch and preQ_{1}-III riboswitch. PreQ_{1}-II riboswitch, only found in Lactobacillales, has a larger and more complex consensus sequence and structure than preQ_{1}-I riboswitch, with an average of 58 nucleotides composing its aptamer, which forms as many as five base-paired substructures. PreQ_{1}-III riboswitch has a distinct structure and is also larger in aptamer size than preQ_{1}-I riboswitch, ranging from sizes ranging from 33 to 58 nucleotides. PreQ_{1}-III riboswitch has an atypically organized pseudoknot that does not appear to incorporate its downstream expression platform at its ribosome binding site (RBS).

== History ==
While preQ_{1} was first discovered as an anticodon sequence of tRNAs from E. coli in 1972, preQ1 riboswitch was not first found until 2004 and recognized even later. The first reported preQ_{1} riboswitch was located in the leader of the Bacillus subtilis ykvJKLM (queCDEF) operon which encodes four genes necessary for queuosine production. In this organism, PreQ_{1} binding to the riboswitch aptamer is thought to induce premature transcription termination within the leader to down-regulate expression of these genes. Later on, preQ1 riboswitch was identified as a conserved sequence on the 5' UTR of genes in many gram-positive bacteria and was proved to be associated with synthesis of preQ_{1}.

In 2008, a second class of preQ_{1} riboswitch (PreQ1-II riboswitches) was also found as a representative of the COG4708 RNA motif from Streptococcus pneumoniae R6. Although PreQ_{1}-II riboswitch also works as queuosine biosynthetic intermediate, the structural and molecular recognition characteristics are distinct from preQ1-I riboswitch, indicating that natural aptamers utilizing different structures to bind the same metabolite may be more common than is currently known.

== Structure and function ==
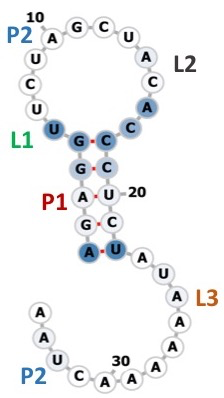
Secondary structure of preQ1 class 1 riboswitch from Bacillus subtilis (Bsu) obtained from (PDB: 3FU2) using web-based RNA structure software, viennaRNA web services where P1 and P2 are the stem region, and L1, L2 and L3 are the loop region. These two stems and three loops form H-type pseudoknot in presence of preQ1.

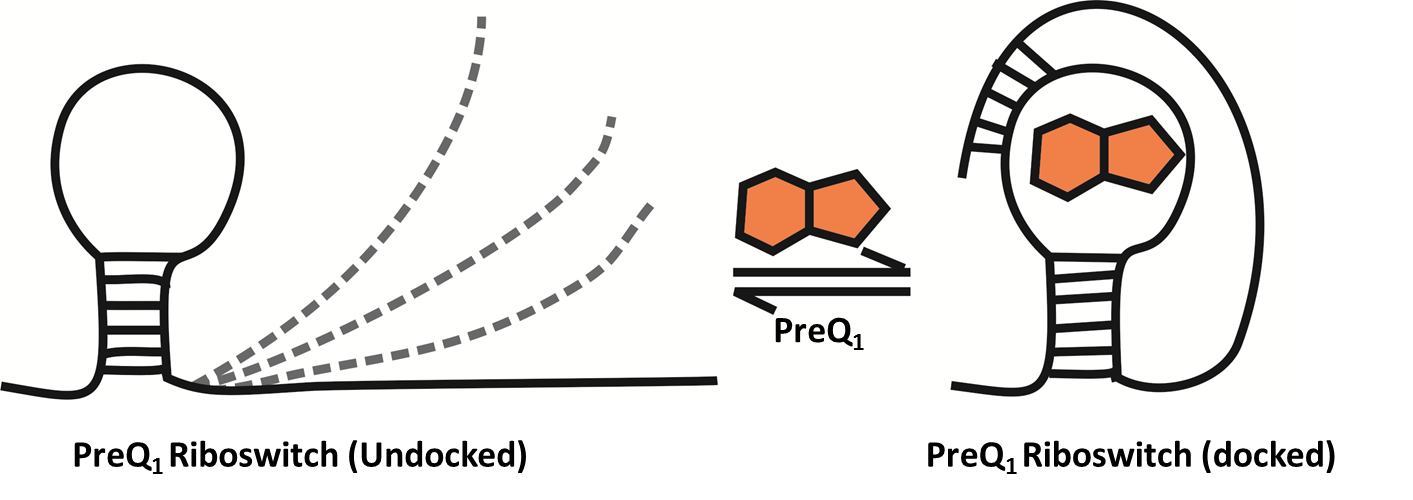
Docking and undocking mechanism of preQ1 riboswitch in presence and absence of ligand preQ1(shown in orange).

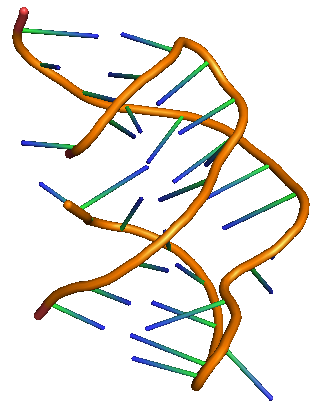
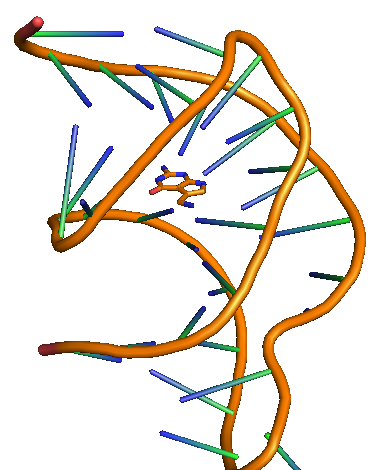
PreQ1 structures Left: Free structure (PDB: 3Q51) Right: Bound structure(PDB: 3Q50) . Both generated by PyMOL using existing crystal structures .

PreQ1 riboswitch has two stems and three loops, and its detailed structure has been shown on the right. The riboswitching action of preQ_{1} riboswitches in bacteria is regulated by binding of metabolite preQ_{1} to the aptamer region leading to structural changes in the messenger RNA (mRNA) that governs the downstream genetic regulation. The preQ_{1} riboswitch structure adopts a compact H-type pseudoknot, which makes it quite different from other purine based riboswitches. The preQ_{1} ligand is buried in the pseudoknot core and stabilized through intercalation between helical stacks and hydrogen bond interaction with heteroatoms. In absence of preQ1, the P2 tail region is away from the P2 loop region and hence the riboswitch is observed to be in undocked (partially docked) state, whereas on the binding of preQ_{1} to the riboswitch results the two P2 regions to come closer causing a complete docking of riboswitch. This docking and undocking mechanism of riboswitch with the change in concentration of ligand preQ_{1} is observed to control the signaling of gene regulation, commonly known as “ON” or “OFF” signaling for gene expression. The docking and undocking mechanism are observed to be affected not only by the ligand, but also with other factors like Mg salt. Like any other riboswitch, the two most common types of gene regulation mediated by preQ_{1} riboswitch are through transcription attenuation or inhibition of translation initiation. Ligand binding to the transcriptional riboswitch in bacterial causes modification in the structure of riboswitch unit, which leads to hindrance in the activity of RNA polymerase causing attenuation of transcription. Similarly, binding of the ligand to the translational riboswitch causes modification in the secondary structure of riboswitch unit leading to hindrance for ribosome binding and hence inhibiting translational initiation.

=== Transcriptional regulation ===
PreQ_{1} mediated transcriptional attenuation is controlled by the dynamic switching of anti-terminator and terminator hairpin in the riboswitch. For preQ_{1} riboswitch from bacteria Bacillus subtilis (Bsu), the anti-terminator is predicted to be less stable than the terminator, as the addition of preQ_{1} shifts the equilibrium significantly towards the formation of terminator. In presence of preQ_{1}, the 3’ end of the adenine rich tail domain pairs with the center of P1 hairpin loop to form an H-type pseudoknot. In the native mRNA structure, binding of preQ_{1} to the aptamer region in the riboswitch leads to the formation of a terminator hairpin which causes RNA polymerase to stop transcription, a process which is commonly known as OFF- regulation of genetic expression or transcription termination.

=== Translation regulation ===
Translation of protein in prokaryotes is initiated by binding of 30S ribosomal subunit to the Shine-Dalgarno (SD) sequence in mRNA. PreQ_{1} mediated inhibition of translational regulation is controlled by blocking the Shine-Dalgarno sequence of mRNA to prevent binding of ribosome to mRNA for translation. Binding of preQ1 to the aptamer domain promotes the sequestration of a part of SD sequence at the 5’ end to the P2 stem of the aptamer domain causing inaccessibility of the SD sequence. The translational riboswitch from bacteria Thermoanaerobacter tengcongensis (Tte) is observed to be transiently closed (pre-docked) in absence of preQ_{1}, whereas in presence of preQ_{1} a fully docked state is adopted. This docking/undocking equilibrium is not only regulated by the concentration of ligand but also by the concentration of Mg salt. The unavailability of SD sequence due to the formation of pseudoknot in presence of preQ_{1} shows the OFF-regulation of genetic expression in translational riboswitch or inhibition of translational initiation.

== Physiological relevance in bacterial gene regulation ==
PreQ_{1} riboswitch activity in Tte bacteria can be measured by the levels of two proteins that are in the coding region of the Tte mRNA, which are TTE1564 and TTE1563. Proteins downstream of the preQ_{1} riboswitch biosynthesize a nucleobase called queuine and a nucleoside queuosine are inhibited by the activation of the preQ1 riboswitch. Queuine is involved in the anticodon sequence of certain tRNA. In bacteria, the hyper-modified nucleobase queuine takes up the first anticodon position, or its wobble position in the tRNA of asparagine, aspartic acid, histidine, and tyrosine. In bacteria the enzyme tRNA-guanine transglycosylase (TGT) catalyzes the swap of a guanine in position 34 of the tRNA with queuine into the first anitcodon position. Eukaryae incorporate queuine into RNA, whereas eubacteria incorporate preQ_{1}, which then undergoes modification to yield queuine. Since queuosine is exclusively produced in bacteria, eukaryotic organisms must obtain their supply of queuosine or its nucleobase queuine from their diet or bacteria from their gut microflora. The implication of a deficiency of queuine or queuosine is an inability to make queuosine-modified tRNA, and furthermore, the inability of the cell to convert phenylalanine to tyrosine.

== See also ==
- PreQ1-II riboswitch
- PreQ1-III riboswitch
