= D arm =

Tertiary structure of tRNA

The D arm is a conserved structural element of transfer RNA (tRNA) composed of a short D stem and a D-loop that characteristically contains the modified nucleotide dihydrouridine. It plays important roles in stabilizing tRNA tertiary structure and in molecular recognition, particularly by aminoacyl-tRNA synthetases during protein synthesis. Although broadly conserved across Bacteria, Archaea, and Eukaryota, the D arm exhibits structural variation among different tRNA types and organisms, and is absent from certain mitochondrial tRNAs.

Transfer RNA

== Structure ==
The D arm is a feature in the tertiary structure of transfer RNA (tRNA). It is composed of two short D stems around 5bp in length leading up to the D-loop. The D-loop contains the base dihydrouridine (D), for which the arm is named. Dihydrouridine is formed by addition of two hydrogens to a uracil (U) base which remove its planar structure and aromaticity. This D modification provides more flexibility to the D-loop structure of the D arm. This appears to play a large role in the stabilization of the tRNA's tertiary structure as demonstrated in a detailed study comparing the structure of the D arm of the Schizosaccharomyces pombe tRNA_{i}^{Met} with an unmodified uracil (U) to with the modified D nucleotide. The D-loop is a highly variable region and is notable for its unusual conformation due to the over-crowding on one of the guanosine residues.

=== Variations in D-arm structure ===
Regions of the tRNA molecule such as the D-loop and D-stem (among others) are broadly conserved among the 20 tRNA types across Bacteria, Archaea, and Eukaryotes. However, there are still some variations such as in bacterial tRNA^{Sec} and tRNA^{Ser} where slight differences in D-stem and D-loop lengths between the two are an important feature in SelA discrimination. Continually, there are more D bases found within D-arms of psychrophilic bacteria and less in thermophilic archaea which may reflect their adaptation to decrease or increase tRNA flexibility due to their unique environmental temperatures.

Despite the importance of the D arm in many tRNAs, the it is absent from some mitochondrial tRNAs from metazoa. Furthermore, there are examples of some mt-tRNA's in across a variety of organisms including Ascaris suum, nematodes, and humans that lack a D arm.

== Function ==
The D loop's main function is that of recognition. It is widely believed that it acts as a recognition site for aminoacyl-tRNA synthetase, an enzyme involved in the aminoacylation of the tRNA molecule. The D stem is also believed to have a recognition role although this has yet to be verified.
