= Dihydrouracil oxidase =

Class of enzymes

dihydrouracil oxidase

Identifiers
- EC no.: 1.3.3.7
- CAS no.: 104327-11-9

Databases
- BRENDA: enzyme data
- ExPASy: NiceZyme view
- KEGG: enzyme entry
- MetaCyc: metabolic pathway
- Rhea: reactions
- PDB structures: RCSB PDB PDBe PDBsum
- Gene Ontology: AmiGO / QuickGO
Search
- PMC: articles
- PubMed: articles
- NCBI: proteins

In enzymology, a dihydrouracil oxidase (EC 1.3.3.7) is an enzyme that catalyzes the chemical reaction

dihydrouracil
O_{2}
H_{2}O_{2}
O_{2}
H_{2}O_{2}
uracil

The two substrates of this enzyme are dihydrouracil and oxygen. Its products are uracil and hydrogen peroxide.

This enzyme belongs to the family of oxidoreductases, specifically those acting on the CH-CH group of donor with oxygen as acceptor. The systematic name of this enzyme class is 5,6-dihydrouracil:oxygen oxidoreductase. It uses the cofactor, flavin mononucleotide.
