= PUA domain =

Protein structural motif

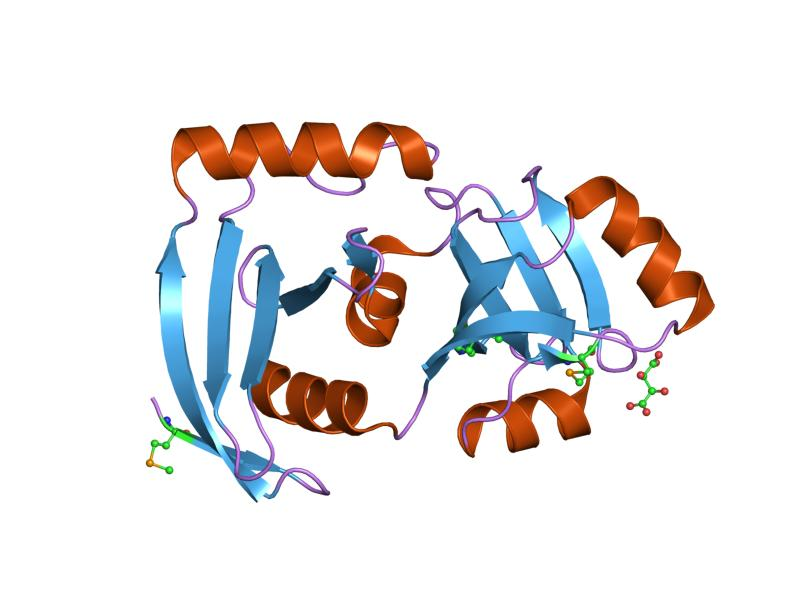
- Cartoon representation of the molecular structure of the crystal structure of the PUA domain-containing protein APE0525 from Aeropyrum pernix HB8 (PDB: 2cx1)

Identifiers
- Symbol: PUA
- Pfam clan: CL0178
- ECOD: 1.1.9

In molecular biology, the PUA domain (pseudouridine synthase and archaeosine transglycosylase domain) is an ancient RNA-binding domain.

== Structure ==
The PUA domain consists of 64-96 amino acids forming a compact alpha/beta fold. It shows six beta-strands and two alpha-helices that cap the structure.

== Function ==
The PUA domain is found in diverse protein families involved in:

- RNA modification: pseudouridine synthases, archaeosine transglycosylases, RNA methyltransferases
- Ribosome biogenesis: H/ACA box ribonucleoproteins, telomerase complex components
- Translation: eukaryotic initiation factors
- Metabolism: glutamate kinases (proline biosynthesis)

== RNA recognition mechanism ==
The PUA domain uses a distinctive "double-edged ledge" formed by the alpha1-beta2 loop and beta6 strand for RNA binding while an "adjacent cleft" alpha1-beta2 accommodates single-stranded RNA overhangs. It has two main binding modes: the sideways binding recognizes minor groove of double-stranded RNA stems; and the terminal binding recognizes the bottom/terminal end of RNA stems across the major groove.

== Evolution and distribution ==
Proteins with the PUA domain are found across bacteria, archaea, and eukaryotes. This domain has evolved as a flexible RNA interaction module, with different proteins using variations in amino acid composition to achieve specific RNA recognition patterns while maintaining the core structural framework.

== Clinical relevance ==
PUA domain proteins are essential for fundamental cellular processes. Some examples of associated diseases are:

- Mutations in the protein dyskerin lead to telomere dysfunction (dyskeratosis congenita)
- MCT1 is implicated in cancer through its role in cell proliferation
- Nsun6 mutations can lead to intellectual disability
