= Archaeosine =

Names
- Preferred IUPAC name 7-Carbaguanosine-7-carboximidamide
- Systematic IUPAC name 2-Amino-7-[(2R,3R,4S,5R)-3,4-dihydroxy-5-(hydroxymethyl)oxolan-2-yl]-4-oxo-4,7-dihydro-3H-pyrrolo[2,3-d]pyrimidine-5-carboximidamide
- Other names 7-formamidino-7-deazaguanosine

Identifiers
| CAS Number | 148608-52-0 |
| 3D model (JSmol) | Interactive image |
| ChEBI | CHEBI:73271 |
| ChemSpider | 117239 |
| PubChem CID | 135718450 |
| CompTox Dashboard (EPA) | DTXSID801318234 |
- InChI: InChI=1S/C12H16N6O5/c13-8(14)3-1-18(9-5(3)10(22)17-12(15)16-9)11-7(21)6(20)4(2-19)23-11/h1,4,6-7,11,19-21H,2H2,(H3,13,14)(H3,15,16,17,22)/t4-,6-,7-,11-/m1/s1 Key: PEMQXWCOMFJRLS-RPKMEZRRSA-N
- SMILES: C1=C(C2=C(N1[C@H]3[C@@H]([C@@H]([C@H](O3)CO)O)O)N=C(NC2=O)N)C(=N)N

Properties
| Chemical formula | C_{12}H_{16}N_{6}O_{5} |
| Molar mass | 324.297 g·mol^{−1} |
- Except where otherwise noted, data are given for materials in their standard state (at 25 °C [77 °F], 100 kPa). Infobox references

Archaeosine (G*), semi-systematic name 7-formamidino-7-deazaguanosine (fa^{7}d^{7}G), is a modified nucleoside found in the dihydrouracil loop at position 15 of tRNAs found in Archaea, and is thought to be important for the heat resistance of thermophilic archaea such as Thermococcus kodakarensis.

== See also ==
- Queuine
