= Queuosine =

Names
- Preferred IUPAC name 7-({[(1S,4S,5R)-4,5-Dihydroxycyclopent-2-en-1-yl]amino}methyl)-7-carbaguanosine
- Systematic IUPAC name 2-Amino-5-({[(1S,4S,5R)-4,5-dihydroxycyclopent-2-en-1-yl]amino}methyl)-7-[(2R,3R,4S,5R)-3,4-dihydroxy-5-(hydroxymethyl)oxolan-2-yl]-3,7-dihydro-4H-pyrrolo[2,3-d]pyrimidin-4-one

Identifiers
CAS Number	57072-36-3
3D model (JSmol)	Interactive image
ChemSpider	38409
PubChem CID	42119
CompTox Dashboard (EPA)	DTXSID50205684
- InChI: InChI=1S/C17H23N5O7/c18-17-20-14-10(15(28)21-17)6(3-19-7-1-2-8(24)11(7)25)4-22(14)16-13(27)12(26)9(5-23)29-16/h1-2,4,7-9,11-13,16,19,23-27H,3,5H2,(H3,18,20,21,28)/t7-,8-,9+,11+,12+,13+,16+/m0/s1 Key: QQXQGKSPIMGUIZ-AEZJAUAXSA-N; InChI=1/C17H23N5O7/c18-17-20-14-10(15(28)21-17)6(3-19-7-1-2-8(24)11(7)25)4-22(14)16-13(27)12(26)9(5-23)29-16/h1-2,4,7-9,11-13,16,19,23-27H,3,5H2,(H3,18,20,21,28)/t7-,8-,9+,11+,12+,13+,16+/m0/s1 Key: QQXQGKSPIMGUIZ-AEZJAUAXBO
- SMILES: C1=C[C@@H]([C@@H]([C@H]1NCC2=CN(C3=C2C(=O)N=C(N3)N)[C@H]4[C@@H]([C@@H]([C@H](O4)CO)O)O)O)O

Properties
Chemical formula	C_{17}H_{23}N_{5}O_{7}
Molar mass	409.399 g·mol^{−1}
- Except where otherwise noted, data are given for materials in their standard state (at 25 °C [77 °F], 100 kPa). verify (what is ?) Infobox references

Queuosine is a modified nucleoside that is present in certain tRNAs in bacteria and eukaryotes. It contains the nucleobase queuine. Originally identified in E. coli, queuosine was found to occupy the first anticodon position of tRNAs for histidine, aspartic acid, asparagine and tyrosine. The first anticodon position pairs with the third "wobble" position in codons, and queuosine improves accuracy of translation compared to guanosine. Synthesis of queuosine begins with GTP. In bacteria, three structurally unrelated classes of riboswitch are known to regulate genes that are involved in the synthesis or transport of pre-queuosine_{1}, a precursor to queuosine: PreQ1-I riboswitches, PreQ1-II riboswitches and PreQ1-III riboswitches.

Queuosine biosynthesis genes have also been found on phage genomes and may be involved in protection from genome degradation by the host.

== Metabolism ==
In August 2025, a significant breakthrough in queuosine metabolism was identified by an international team of researchers who solved a 30-year mystery regarding how the micronutrient is absorbed by human cells. The study identified the gene SLC35F2, previously known as an oncogene, as the specific high-affinity transporter responsible for salvaging queuosine and its precursor, queuine, from the gut microbiome and dietary sources. This discovery explains the mechanism by which this "hidden nutrient" is distributed across billions of human cells to facilitate the modification of transfer RNA (tRNA).

The identification of the SLC35F2 transporter links queuosine availability directly to several critical physiological processes, including brain health, memory formation, and cancer suppression. Because humans cannot synthesize queuosine de novo, the efficiency of this transporter is essential for "fine-tuning" genetic translation by ensuring proper tRNA decoding. Researchers suggest that this discovery opens new avenues for therapeutic interventions, particularly in using queuosine as a biomarker or treatment target for metabolic regulation, stress response, and neurodevelopmental stability.
