= Queuine tRNA-ribosyltransferase =

Class of enzymes

queuine tRNA-ribosyltransferase

Identifiers
- EC no.: 2.4.2.29
- CAS no.: 72162-89-1

Databases
- IntEnz: IntEnz view
- BRENDA: BRENDA entry
- ExPASy: NiceZyme view
- KEGG: KEGG entry
- MetaCyc: metabolic pathway
- PRIAM: profile
- PDB structures: RCSB PDB PDBe PDBsum
- Gene Ontology: AmiGO / QuickGO
Search
- PMC: articles
- PubMed: articles
- NCBI: proteins

In enzymology, a queuine tRNA-ribosyltransferase (EC 2.4.2.29) is an enzyme that catalyzes the chemical reaction

[tRNA]-guanine + queuine $\rightleftharpoons$ [tRNA]-queuine + guanine

Thus, the two substrates of this enzyme are tRNA-guanine and queuine, whereas its two products are [tRNA]-queuine and guanine.

This enzyme belongs to the family of glycosyltransferases, specifically the pentosyltransferases. The systematic name of this enzyme class is [tRNA]-guanine:queuine tRNA-D-ribosyltransferase. Other names in common use include tRNA-guanine transglycosylase, guanine insertion enzyme, tRNA transglycosylase, Q-insertase, queuine transfer ribonucleate ribosyltransferase, transfer ribonucleate glycosyltransferase, tRNA guanine transglycosidase, guanine, queuine-tRNA transglycosylase, and tRNA-guanine:queuine tRNA-D-ribosyltransferase.

== Structural studies ==
As of late 2007, 36 structures have been solved for this class of enzymes, with PDB accession codes 1EFZ, 1ENU, 1F3E, 1IQ8, 1IT7, 1IT8, 1J2B, 1K4G, 1K4H, 1N2V, 1OZM, 1OZQ, 1P0B, 1P0D, 1P0E, 1PUD, 1PXG, 1Q2R, 1Q2S, 1Q4W, 1Q63, 1Q65, 1Q66, 1R5Y, 1S38, 1S39, 1WKD, 1WKE, 1WKF, 1Y5V, 1Y5W, 1Y5X, 2ASH, 2BBF, 2QII, and 2QZR.
