= Dihydrouracil dehydrogenase (NAD+) =

Class of enzymes

dihydrouracil dehydrogenase (NAD+)

Identifiers
- EC no.: 1.3.1.1
- CAS no.: 9026-89-5

Databases
- IntEnz: IntEnz view
- BRENDA: BRENDA entry
- ExPASy: NiceZyme view
- KEGG: KEGG entry
- MetaCyc: metabolic pathway
- PRIAM: profile
- PDB structures: RCSB PDB PDBe PDBsum
- Gene Ontology: AmiGO / QuickGO
Search
- PMC: articles
- PubMed: articles
- NCBI: proteins

In enzymology, dihydrouracil dehydrogenase (NAD+) (EC 1.3.1.1) is an enzyme that catalyzes the chemical reaction

dihydrouracil
+ NAD^{+}
H^{+}
H^{+}
uracil
+ NADH

The two substrates of this enzyme are dihydrouracil and oxidised nicotinamide adenine dinucleotide (NAD^{+}). Its products are the nucleotide base uracil, reduced NADH, and a proton. This enzyme can also utilise the alternative nucleotide base thymine to give dihydrothymine. The enzyme is most often associated with the catabolism of these bases.

This enzyme belongs to the family of oxidoreductases, specifically those acting on the CH-CH group of donor with NAD+ or NADP+ as acceptor. The systematic name of this enzyme class is 5,6-dihydrouracil:NAD+ oxidoreductase. Other names in common use include dehydrogenase, dihydrouracil, dihydropyrimidine dehydrogenase, dihydrothymine dehydrogenase, pyrimidine reductase, thymine reductase, uracil reductase, and dihydrouracil dehydrogenase (NAD+). This enzyme participates in 3 metabolic pathways: pyrimidine metabolism, beta-alanine metabolism, and pantothenate and coa biosynthesis.
