= TRNA(His) guanylyltransferase =

tRNA(His) guanylyltransferase

Identifiers
- EC no.: 2.7.7.79

Databases
- IntEnz: IntEnz view
- BRENDA: BRENDA entry
- ExPASy: NiceZyme view
- KEGG: KEGG entry
- MetaCyc: metabolic pathway
- PRIAM: profile
- PDB structures: RCSB PDB PDBe PDBsum
Search
- PMC: articles
- PubMed: articles
- NCBI: proteins

tRNA(His) guanylyltransferase (EC 2.7.7.79, histidine tRNA guanylyltransferase, Thg1p, Thg1) is an enzyme with systematic name p-tRNA(His):GTP guanylyltransferase (ATP-hydrolysing). This enzyme catalyses the following chemical reaction

p-tRNA(His) + ATP + GTP $\rightleftharpoons$ pppGp-tRNA(His) + AMP + diphosphate (overall reaction)
(1a) p-tRNA(His) + ATP $\rightleftharpoons$ App-tRNA(His) + diphosphate
(1b) App-tRNA(His) + GTP $\rightleftharpoons$ pppGp-tRNA(His) + AMP

The enzyme requires a divalent cation for activity.

Thg1 enzymes are the only nucleic acid polymerases known to be capable of catalyzing nucleotide addition in the 3′–5′ direction.
