= PreQ1-II riboswitch =

Class of riboswitches

preQ1-II (pre queuosine) riboswitch
- Predicted secondary structure and sequence conservation of preQ1-II

Identifiers
- Symbol: preQ1-II
- Alt. Symbols: COG4708
- Rfam: RF01054

Other data
- RNA type: Cis-reg; riboswitch
- Domain(s): Bacteria
- SO: SO:0005836
- PDB structures: PDBe

PreQ1-II riboswitches form a class of riboswitches that specifically bind pre-queuosine_{1} (PreQ_{1}), a precursor of the modified nucleoside queuosine. They are found in certain species of Streptococcus and Lactococcus, and were originally identified as a conserved RNA secondary structure called the "COG4708 motif". All known members of this riboswitch class appear to control members of COG4708 genes. These genes are predicted to encode membrane-bound proteins and have been proposed to be a transporter of preQ_{1}, or a related metabolite, based on their association with preQ_{1}-binding riboswitches. PreQ1-II riboswitches have no apparent similarities in sequence or structure to preQ1-I riboswitches, a previously discovered class of preQ_{1}-binding riboswitches. PreQ_{1} thus joins S-adenosylmethionine as the second metabolite to be found that is the ligand of more than one riboswitch class.

Consensus secondary structure of PreQ_{1}-II riboswitches. Layout is similar to that used in previously published depictions.
