= Dihydrouracil =

Names
- Preferred IUPAC name 1,3-Diazinane-2,4-dione
- Other names Dihydropyrimidine-2,4(1H,3H)-dione

Identifiers
CAS Number	504-07-4
3D model (JSmol)	Interactive image
ChemSpider	629
ECHA InfoCard	100.007.257
MeSH	Dihydrouracil
PubChem CID	649
UNII	016FR52RU5
CompTox Dashboard (EPA)	DTXSID7060122
- InChI: InChI=1S/C4H6N2O2/c7-3-1-2-5-4(8)6-3/h1-2H2,(H2,5,6,7,8) Key: OIVLITBTBDPEFK-UHFFFAOYSA-N; InChI=1/C4H6N2O2/c7-3-1-2-5-4(8)6-3/h1-2H2,(H2,5,6,7,8) Key: OIVLITBTBDPEFK-UHFFFAOYAM
- SMILES: C1CNC(=O)NC1=O

Properties
Chemical formula	C_{4}H_{6}N_{2}O_{2}
Molar mass	114.10264
- Except where otherwise noted, data are given for materials in their standard state (at 25 °C [77 °F], 100 kPa). verify (what is ?) Infobox references

Dihydrouracil is an intermediate in the catabolism of uracil. The enzyme dihydrouracil dehydrogenase (NAD+) converts uracil to dihydrouracil:

uracil
+ NADH
H^{+}
H^{+}
dihydrouracil
+ NAD^{+}

The enzyme uses reduced nicotinamide adenine dinucleotide (NADH) as its cofactor.

Dihydrouracil is the base present in the nucleoside dihydrouridine.

== See also ==
- Dihydrouracil oxidase
- Dihydropyrimidinase
