= 2-(β-D-Glucopyranosyl)-5-methyl-1,3,4-oxadiazole =

Identifiers
- IUPAC name: (2R,3S,4S,5R,6R)-2-(Hydroxymethyl)-6-(5-methyl-1,3,4-oxadiazol-2-yl)tetrahydro-2H-pyran-3,4,5-triol
- PubChem CID: 657043
- DrugBank: DB03354
- ChemSpider: 571261
- ChEBI: CHEBI:44722
- ChEMBL: ChEMBL540929

Chemical and physical data
- Formula: C_{9}H_{14}N_{2}O_{6}
- Molar mass: 246.219 g·mol^{−1}
- 3D model (JSmol): Interactive image
- SMILES: CC1=NN=C(O1)[C@H]2[C@@H]([C@H]([C@@H]([C@H](O2)CO)O)O)O
- InChI: InChI=1S/C9H14N2O6/c1-3-10-11-9(16-3)8-7(15)6(14)5(13)4(2-12)17-8/h4-8,12-15H,2H2,1H3/t4-,5-,6+,7-,8-/m1/s1; Key:HCSFWJQLIPWUFZ-JAJWTYFOSA-N

2-(β-D-Glucopyranosyl)-5-methyl-1,3,4-oxadiazole is a C-glycoside compound studied as an enzyme inhibitor for potential use in diabetes treatment.

== Chemistry ==
2-(β-D-Glucopyranosyl)-5-methyl-1,3,4-oxadiazole combines a glucose molecule linked to an oxadiazole. It is classified as a C-glycoside because the sugar is attached by a stable carbon-to-carbon bond.

== Mechanism of action ==
The compound 2-(β-D-Glucopyranosyl)-5-methyl-1,3,4-oxadiazole works by blocking an enzyme called glycogen phosphorylase, which breaks down stored sugar in the body.

== Research ==
Researchers hope that by using 2-(β-D-Glucopyranosyl)-5-methyl-1,3,4-oxadiazole to block glycogen phosphorylase, they may be able to design future medications that control high blood sugar.

== History ==
Despite being tested in laboratories and analyzed using protein crystallography to see how it binds to glycogen phosphorylase, it is a research compound rather than an approved medicine.
