= Methionyl-tRNA formyltransferase =

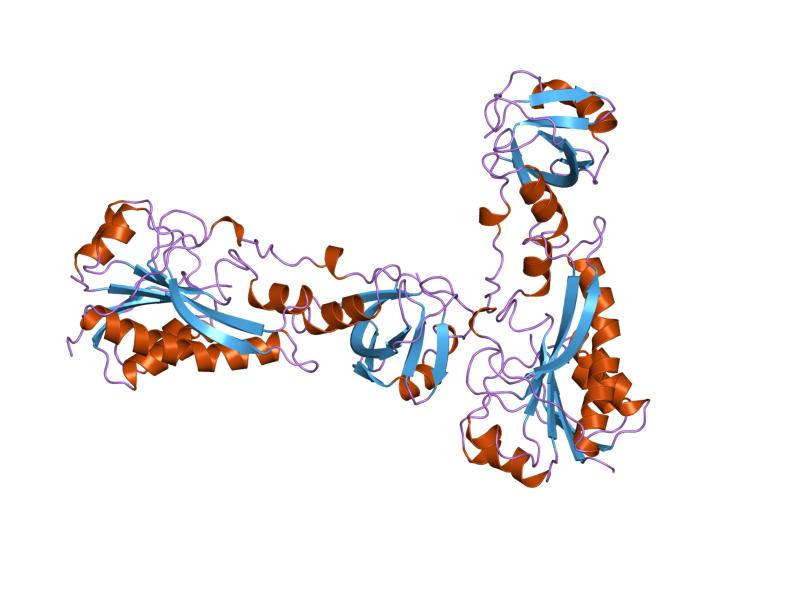
- Structure of Fmt in Escherichia coli

Identifiers
- EC no.: 2.1.2.9
- CAS no.: 9015-76-3
- Alt. names: N10-formyltetrahydrofolic-methionyl-transfer ribonucleic, transformylase, formylmethionyl-transfer ribonucleic synthetase, methionyl ribonucleic formyltransferase, methionyl-tRNA Met formyltransferase, methionyl-tRNA transformylase, methionyl-transfer RNA transformylase, methionyl-transfer ribonucleate methyltransferase, methionyl-transfer ribonucleic transformylase

Databases
- IntEnz: IntEnz view
- BRENDA: BRENDA entry
- ExPASy: NiceZyme view
- KEGG: KEGG entry
- MetaCyc: metabolic pathway
- PRIAM: profile
- PDB structures: RCSB PDB PDBe PDBsum
- Gene Ontology: AmiGO / QuickGO
Search
- PMC: articles
- PubMed: articles
- NCBI: proteins

In enzymology, a methionyl-tRNA formyltransferase (EC 2.1.2.9) is an enzyme that catalyzes the chemical reaction

10-formyltetrahydrofolate + L-methionyl-tRNA^{fMet} + H_{2}O $\rightleftharpoons$ tetrahydrofolate + N-formylmethionyl-tRNA^{fMet}

This enzyme belongs to the family of transferases that transfer one-carbon groups, specifically the hydroxymethyl-, formyl- and related transferases. The systematic name of this enzyme class is 10-formyltetrahydrofolate:L-methionyl-tRNA N-formyltransferase. This enzyme participates in three metabolic pathways: methionine metabolism, one carbon pool by folate, and aminoacyl-tRNA biosynthesis.

== Structural studies ==
As of late 2007, two structures have been solved for this class of enzymes, with PDB accession codes 1FMT and 2FMT.
