= Transfer RNA-like structures =

RNA sequences similar in structure to tRNA, found in plant virus genomes

Transfer RNA-like structures (tRNA-like structures) are RNA sequences, which have a similar tertiary structure to tRNA; they frequently contain a pseudoknot close to the 3' end. The presence of tRNA-like structures has been demonstrated in many plant virus RNA genomes. These tRNA-like structures are linked to regulation of plant virus replication.

tRNA-like structures mimic some tRNA function, such as aminoacylation. There are three aminoacylation specificities, valine, histidine and tyrosine. For example, valine binds to the tRNA-like structure of the turnip yellow mosaic virus genome whilst tyrosine binds to the tRNA-like structure of the barley stripe mosaic virus genome. tRNA-like structures which lack the 3' termini lack complete or partial tRNA mimicry.

tRNA-like structures are required for RNA encapsulation and increase RNA stability. They also act as 3'-translational enhancers and regulators of minus strand synthesis.
