= Dihydrothymine =

Names
- IUPAC name 5-methylhexahydropyrimidine-2,4-dione

Identifiers
CAS Number	696-04-8
3D model (JSmol)	Interactive image
ChemSpider	84456
ECHA InfoCard	100.010.717
MeSH	5,6-dihydrothymine
PubChem CID	93556
UNII	Z51MHT1W75
CompTox Dashboard (EPA)	DTXSID30862375
- InChI: InChI=1S/C5H8N2O2/c1-3-2-6-5(9)7-4(3)8/h3H,2H2,1H3,(H2,6,7,8,9) Key: NBAKTGXDIBVZOO-UHFFFAOYSA-N
- SMILES: CC1CNC(=O)NC1=O

Properties
Chemical formula	C_{5}H_{8}N_{2}O_{2}
Molar mass	128.131 g·mol^{−1}
- Except where otherwise noted, data are given for materials in their standard state (at 25 °C [77 °F], 100 kPa). Infobox references

Dihydrothymine is an intermediate in the metabolism of thymine. The enzyme dihydrouracil dehydrogenase (NAD+) converts thymine to dihydrothymine in the reaction:

thymine
+ NADH
H^{+}
H^{+}
dihydrothymine
+ NAD^{+}
