= Aminoacylation =

Chemical reaction

Aminoacylation is the process of adding an aminoacyl group to a compound.

== See also ==
- Acylation
- tRNA aminoacylation
- Transfer RNA-like structures
