= Dihydrouridine =

Chemical compound

Names
- IUPAC name 5,6-Dihydrouridine
- Systematic IUPAC name 1-[(2R,3R,4S,5R)-3,4-Dihydroxy-5-(hydroxymethyl)oxolan-2-yl]-1,3-diazinane-2,4-dione
- Other names 1,3,5,6-tetrahydrouridine

Identifiers
CAS Number	5627-05-4
3D model (JSmol)	Interactive image; Interactive image
ChemSpider	85115
ECHA InfoCard	100.257.727
PubChem CID	94312
UNII	0D5FR359JO
CompTox Dashboard (EPA)	DTXSID6021329
- InChI: InChI=1S/C9H14N2O6/c12-3-4-6(14)7(15)8(17-4)11-2-1-5(13)10-9(11)16/h4,6-8,12,14-15H,1-3H2,(H,10,13,16)/t4-,6-,7-,8-/m1/s1 Key: ZPTBLXKRQACLCR-XVFCMESISA-N; InChI=1/C9H14N2O6/c12-3-4-6(14)7(15)8(17-4)11-2-1-5(13)10-9(11)16/h4,6-8,12,14-15H,1-3H2,(H,10,13,16)/t4-,6-,7-,8-/m1/s1 Key: ZPTBLXKRQACLCR-XVFCMESIBI
- SMILES: C1CN(C(=O)NC1=O)[C@H]2[C@@H]([C@@H]([C@H](O2)CO)O)O; O=C1N(CCC(=O)N1)[C@@H]2O[C@@H]([C@@H](O)[C@H]2O)CO

Properties
Chemical formula	C_{9}H_{14}N_{2}O_{6}
Molar mass	246.217 g/mol
- Except where otherwise noted, data are given for materials in their standard state (at 25 °C [77 °F], 100 kPa). verify (what is ?) Infobox references

Dihydrouridine (abbreviated as D, hU, DHU, or UH_{2}) is a pyrimidine nucleoside which is the result of adding two hydrogen atoms to a uridine, making it a fully saturated pyrimidine ring with no remaining double bonds. D is found in tRNA and rRNA molecules as a nucleoside; the corresponding nucleobase is 5,6-dihydrouracil.

Structure of base pair Adenine Dihydrouracil (AD)

Because it is non-planar, D disturbs the stacking interactions in helices and destabilizes the RNA structure. D also stabilizes the C2′-endo sugar conformation, which is more flexible than the C3′-endo conformation; this effect is propagated to the 5′-neighboring residue. Thus, while pseudouridine and 2′-O-methylations stabilize the local RNA structure, D does the opposite.

The tRNAs of organisms that grow at low temperatures (psychrophiles) have high 5,6-dihydrouridine levels (40-70% more on average) which provides the necessary local flexibility of the tRNA at or below the freezing point.
