= EF1 guanine nucleotide exchange domain =

EF1_GNE
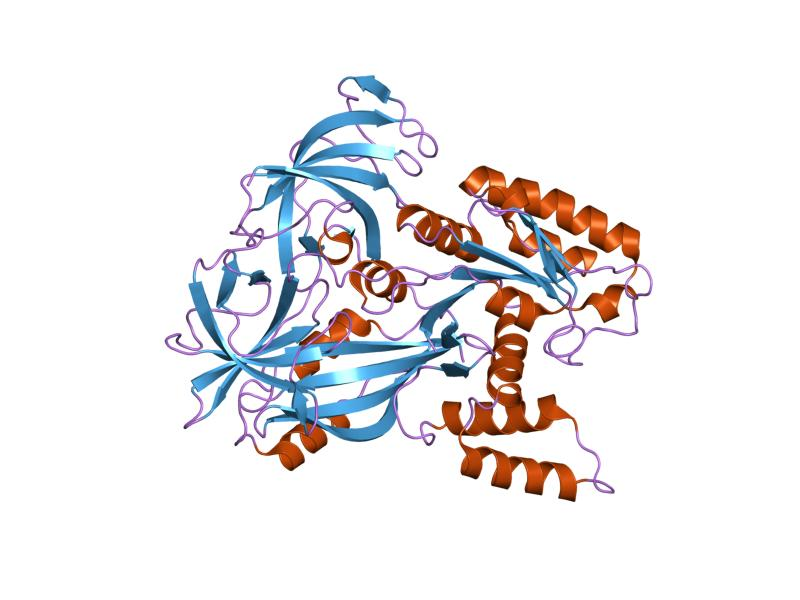
- yeast guanine nucleotide exchange factor eef1balpha k205a mutant in complex with eef1a

Identifiers
- Symbol: EF1_GNE
- Pfam: PF00736
- InterPro: IPR014038
- PROSITE: PDOC00648
- SCOP2: 1b64 / SCOPe / SUPFAM
- CDD: cd00292
Available protein structures:
- Pfam: structures / ECOD
- PDB: RCSB PDB; PDBe; PDBj
- PDBsum: structure summary

In molecular biology, the EF1 guanine nucleotide exchange domain is a protein domain found in the beta and delta chains of elongation factors from eukaryotes and archaea.

Elongation factor EF1B (also known as EF-Ts or EF-1beta/gamma/delta) is a nucleotide exchange factor that is required to regenerate EF1A from its inactive form (EF1A-GDP) to its active form (EF1A-GTP). EF1A is then ready to interact with a new aminoacyl-tRNA to begin the cycle again. EF1B is more complex in eukaryotes than in bacteria, and can consist of three subunits: EF1B-alpha (or EF-1beta), EF1B-gamma (or EF-1gamma) and EF1B-beta (or EF-1delta).

The EF1 guanine nucleotide exchange domain is found in the beta (EF-1beta, also known as EF1B-alpha) and delta (EF-1delta, also known as EF1B-beta) chains of EF1B proteins from eukaryotes and archaea. The beta and delta chains have exchange activity, which mainly resides in their homologous guanine nucleotide exchange domains, found in the C-terminal region of the peptides. Their N-terminal regions may be involved in interactions with the gamma chain (EF-1gamma).
