= Chromosome instability syndrome =

Group of inherited conditions

Chromosome instability syndromes are a group of inherited conditions associated with chromosomal instability and breakage. They often lead to an increased tendency to develop certain types of malignancies.

The following chromosome instability syndromes are known:

- Ataxia telangiectasia
- Ataxia telangiectasia-like disorder
- Bloom syndrome
- Fanconi anaemia
- Nijmegen breakage syndrome

== Neurodegenerative diseases ==
Chromosome instability syndromes include several inherited neurodegenerative diseases that are due to mutations in genes that encode enzymes necessary for DNA repair. Epigenetic alterations often occur in association with the DNA repair defect, and such alterations likely have a role in the etiology of the disease. Chromosome instability syndromes due to impaired DNA repair and with features of neurodegeneration and epigenetic alteration were summarized by Bernstein and Bernstein. These syndromes include Aicardi-Goutieres syndrome, amyotrophic lateral sclerosis, ataxia-telangiectasia, Cockayne syndrome, fragile X syndrome, Friedrich's ataxia, Huntington's disease, spinocerebellar ataxia type 1, trichothiodystrophy and xeroderma pigmentosum.

== Hypogonadism ==
Genes MCM8 and MCM9 encode proteins that form a complex. This complex functions in homologous recombination and repair of DNA double-strand breaks. Inherited mutations in MCM8 and MCM9 can cause a chromosomal instability syndrome characterized by ovarian failure. The germline MCM8-MCM9 protein complex is most likely required for the resolution of double-strand breaks that occur during homologous recombination in the pachytene stage of meiosis I.
