= HROB (gene) =

Identifiers
- Aliases: HROB, chromosome 17 open reading frame 53, C17orf53, MCM8IP, homologous recombincation factor with OB-fold, homologous recombination factor with OB-fold
- External IDs: MGI: 2387601; GeneCards: HROB

Gene location (Human)
Chr.	Chromosome 17 (human)
Band	17q21.31	Start	44,141,906 bp
Band	17q21.31	End	44,162,476 bp

Gene location (Mouse)
Chr.	Chromosome 11 (mouse)
Band	11|11 D	Start	102,139,708 bp
Band	11|11 D	End	102,156,013 bp
RNA expression pattern
Bgee	Human / Mouse (ortholog); Top expressed in: testicle; gonad; oocyte; right testis; left testis; ventricular zone; secondary oocyte; ganglionic eminence; stromal cell of endometrium; bone marrow / Top expressed in: zygote; tail of embryo; secondary oocyte; morula; primary oocyte; blastocyst; spermatocyte; genital tubercle; epiblast; spermatid; More reference expression data
BioGPS	n/a
Orthologs
Databases	NCBI: entry; OMA: entry
Species	Human	Mouse
Entrez	78995	217216
Ensembl	ENSG00000125319	ENSMUSG00000034773
UniProt	Q8N3J3	Q32P12
RefSeq (mRNA)	NM_001171251; NM_024032; NM_001321310; NM_001321311	NM_153544
RefSeq (protein)	NP_001164722; NP_001308239; NP_001308240; NP_076937	NP_705772
Location (UCSC)	Chr 17: 44.14 – 44.16 Mb	Chr 11: 102.14 – 102.16 Mb
PubMed search
- Wikidata
View/Edit Human	View/Edit Mouse

Homologous recombination OB-fold protein is a protein which in humans is encoded by the gene HROB (previously C17orf53). It is involved in the repair of DNA, and is most highly expressed in the digestive system and female reproductive system. Pathogenic variants have been associated with female reproductive system dysfunction, including premature menopause and ovarian dysgenesis.

== Gene ==
=== Gene neighborhood ===
Neighboring genes of HROB are that of RNU6-131, RNA U6 Small Nuclear 131 Pseudogene, and ASB16, Ankyrin Repeat And SOCS Box Containing 16.

=== Expression ===
HROB has been observed to be expressed ubiquitously across almost all tissue types of the body, but with highest expression found in the duodenum and fallopian tubes, while in the brain there was little region specificity. However, inconsistencies between antibody staining and RNA expression make interpretation of these results difficult.

=== Transcript variants ===
The coding region of HROB consists of 2699 base pairs and encodes for a protein that is 647 amino acids long. Per NCBI AceView, the transcription of HROB produces nine alternatively spliced mRNAs and 17 distinct gt-ag introns Of these nine alternatively spliced variants four distinct protein products are formed.

Isoforms of HROB
Name	Reference Sequence Number	Length (aa)	Mass (Da)
Q8N3J3-1	NM_024032.4	647	69,771
Q8N3J3-2	NM_001171251.2	137	14,269
Q8N3J3-3	NM_001321310.1	521	56,181
Q8N3J3-4	NM_001321311.1	646	69,643

== Protein ==
=== General properties ===
The molecular weight of HROB is 69 kilodaltons. The isoelectric point is 5.85. The protein sequence of HROB is both Proline and Glutamine rich, while low in Tyrosine. Aside from Proline, Glutamine, and Tyrosine, there exists a relatively even distribution of amino acids in the protein product of HROB.

=== Subcellular localization ===
The protein product of HROB has been shown to target the nucleus, with minor localization in the cytoplasm.

== Interacting proteins ==
- MCM8, MCM9 — HROB interacts with the MCM8-MCM9 helicase complex, which is involved in DNA repair. In particular, it helps recruit the complex to areas of damaged DNA.
- RPA1 — HROB interacts with the heterotrimeric RPA complex via its interaction with RPA1. This complex helps stabilize DNA while it’s being repaired.
