= Ganfeborole =

Chemical compound

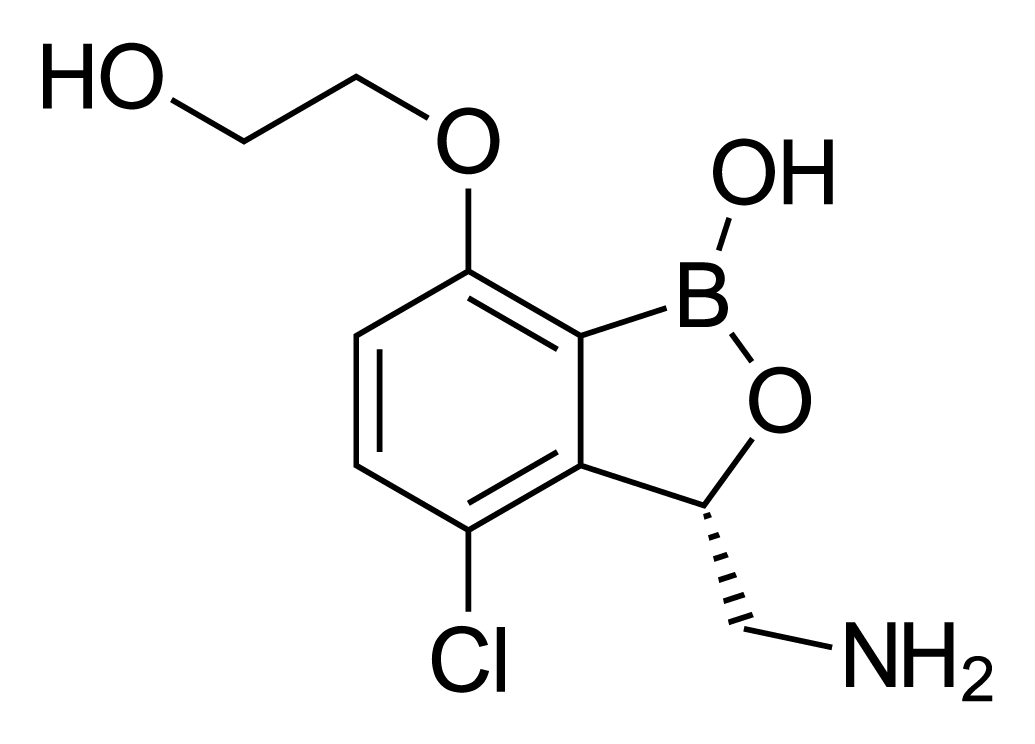

Identifiers
- IUPAC name: 2-[[(3S)-3-(Aminomethyl)-4-chloro-1-hydroxy-3H-2,1-benzoxaborol-7-yl]oxy]ethanol
- CAS Number: 2131798-12-2
- PubChem CID: 133080621
- ChemSpider: 71046056
- UNII: KZ8H57WFC7
- ChEMBL: ChEMBL4116378

Chemical and physical data
- Formula: C_{10}H_{13}BClNO_{4}
- Molar mass: 257.48 g·mol^{−1}
- 3D model (JSmol): Interactive image
- SMILES: B1(C2=C(C=CC(=C2[C@H](O1)CN)Cl)OCCO)O(C(=O)N1)CCN)CCN)CC(C)C)CC2=CC=CC=C2)CCN)NC(=O)[C@@H](CO)NC(=O)[C@H]([C@@H](C)O)NC(=O)C)O
- InChI: InChI=1S/C10H13BClNO4/c12-6-1-2-7(16-4-3-14)10-9(6)8(5-13)17-11(10)15/h1-2,8,14-15H,3-5,13H2/t8-/m1/s1; Key:DJUOWOXTPXUHDQ-MRVPVSSYSA-N

Ganfeborole (GSK3036656, GSK-070) is an experimental antibiotic which shows activity against Mycobacterium tuberculosis. It acts as a potent and selective inhibitor of the bacterial leucyl-tRNA synthetase enzyme, and is currently in clinical trials.
