= XX gonadal dysgenesis =

- Other names: XX ovarian dysgenesis, Perrault syndrome
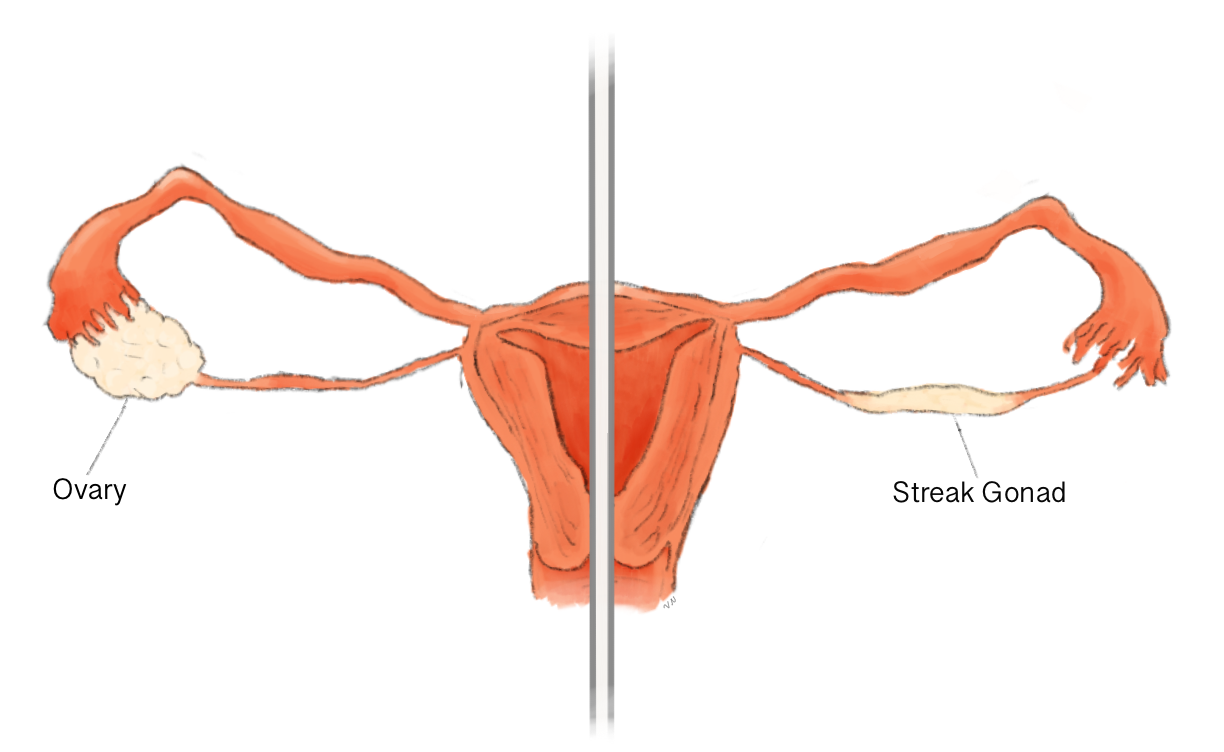
- Ovary (left) and streak gonad (right).
- Specialty: Medical genetics

XX gonadal dysgenesis, also called 46,XX ovarian dysgenesis, is a type of female hypogonadism where the ovaries fail to develop normally, leading to them being unable to induce puberty in an otherwise normal girl, whose karyotype is 46,XX. Individuals with XX gonadal dysgenesis have normal-appearing external genitalia as well as Müllerian structures (e.g., cervix, vagina, uterus). Due to the nearly absent or nonfunctional streak ovaries (under-developed ovaries that are then small and fibrous tissue, hence the term "streak"), the individual is low in estrogen levels (hypoestrogenic) and has high levels of follicle-stimulating hormone (FSH) and luteinizing hormone (LH), hormones that cycle in the reproductive system. As a result, the diagnosis often occurs after a concern for delayed puberty or amenorrhea. Treatment generally involves hormone replacement therapy with estrogen and progesterone.

== Presentation ==
=== Signs and symptoms ===
Individuals with XX gonadal dysgenesis appear phenotypical female with normal internal and external genitalia, bilateral streak gonads, and normal stature. Diagnosis commonly occurs in adolescence due to delayed puberty or amenorrhea. Some individuals may have some breast development, secondary amenorrhea, or ovarian follicles on imaging rather than the expected streak or hypoplastic ovaries.

There have been cases with other associated features such as sensorineural hearing loss (i.e., Perrault Syndrome), neurologic abnormalities, renal disease, malformation syndromes (patterned birth defects), clitoromegaly, or cerebellar ataxia.

=== Related conditions ===
The term "pure gonadal dysgenesis" (PGD) has been used to differentiate between gonadal dysgenesis related to Turner syndrome. Turner syndrome occurs due to partial or complete absence of one of the X chromosomes, resulting in 45,XO or 45,X. Some associated characteristics include short stature, a broad shield-like chest, webbed neck, premature ovarian failure, and heart and kidney abnormalities. People with XX gonadal dysgenesis do not generally have the characteristics just listed, other than the primary ovarian insufficiency.

Meanwhile in PGD, the chromosomal constellation is either 46,XX or 46,XY. Thus XX gonadal dysgenesis is also referred to as PGD, 46 XX. Meanwhile, XY gonadal dysgenesis is known as PGD, 46,XY or Swyer syndrome. Patients with PGD have a normal chromosomal constellation but may have localized genetic alterations. XX gonadal dysgenesis is related to Swyer syndrome, since both conditions have the same phenotype and clinical issues; however in Swyer syndrome the karyotype is 46,XY. Gonadectomy is recommended in individuals with Swyer syndrome due to the risk of malignant tumors from the mosaicism in the Y chromosome.

Gonadal dysgenesis has also been related to other syndromes such as Wilms tumour-aniridia syndrome (WAGR syndrome). As described in the name, individuals with this syndrome have a Wilms tumor (type of renal cancer), aniridia (partial or complete absence of the iris), genitourinary abnormalities, as well as development delay. Gonadal dysgenesis is also seen in Denys-Drash Syndrome (affects the kidneys and genitalia) and Malouf syndrome (involves the heart, genitalia, and bones).

== Pathogenesis ==
XX gonadal dysgenesis is thought to be mainly caused by genetic defects in the pathways of ovarian development, specifically via autosomal-recessive inheritance since a positive family history or consanguinity has been noted. However, sporadic cases also have been reported. Ongoing research has identified some implicated genes, listed below, which often are in pathways of gonadal differentiation and formation as well as germ cell migration.

=== Ovarian dysgenesis ===
Name	OMIM code	Gene	Notes
Ovarian dysgenesis-1	233300	FSHR	Receptor of follicle stimulating hormone, which is needed for gonadal development, has been seen in familial and sporadic cases
Ovarian dysgenesis-2	300247	BMP15	X-linked mutations in growth factor expressed during ovarian development
Ovarian dysgenesis-3	614324	PSMC3IP	Nuclear protein involved in meiosis, seen in cases of autosomal recessive inheritance
Ovarian dysgenesis-4	616185	MCM9	
Ovarian dysgenesis-5	617690	SOHLH1	
Ovarian dysgenesis-7	618117	MRPS22	
Ovarian dysgenesis-9	619665	SPIDR	
Ovarian dysgenesis-11	620897	HROB	

Note: Ovarian dysgenesis-6, 8, and 10 correspond to potential causes that each have not yet been found outside of a single family.

=== Perrault syndrome ===
In cases of XX gonadal dysgenesis with hearing involvement (Perrault syndrome), the following genes are implicated:

Name	OMIM code	Gene	Notes
Perrault syndrome-1	233400	HSD17B4	Involved in steroidogenesis and fatty acid metabolism.
Perrault syndrome-2	614926	HARS2	A mitochondrial tRNA synthetase gene.
Perrault syndrome-3	614129	CLPP	A mitochondrial protease
Perrault syndrome-4	615300	LARS2	Another mitochondrial tRNA synthetase gene.
Perrault syndrome-5	616138	TWNK	A mitochondrial helicase
Perrault syndrome-6	617565	ERAL1	A mitochondrial rRNA chaperone
Perrault syndrome-7	621101	DAP3	

=== Related conditions ===
Name	OMIM code	Gene	Notes
Malouf syndrome	212112	LMNA	
Premature ovarian failure-3	608996	FOXL2	Mutations can cause blepharophimosis, ptosis, epicanthus inversus syndrome (syndrome with eyelid defects and primary ovarian insufficiency).
Premature ovarian failure-5	610934	NOBOX	Transcription factor involved in oocyte development.
premature ovarian failure-6	612310	FIGLA	Transcription factor involved in activating oocyte-related genes.
Leukoencephalopathy with vanishing white matter 2, with or without ovarian failure	620312	EIF2B2	Involved in protein production, mutations have been associated with leukodystrophy and primary ovarian failure.
Leukoencephalopathy with vanishing white matter 4, with or without ovarian failure	620314	EIF2B4	Involved in protein production, mutations have been associated with leukodystrophy and primary ovarian failure.
Leukoencephalopathy with vanishing white matter 5, with or without ovarian failure	620315	EIF2B5	Involved in protein production, mutations have been associated with leukodystrophy and primary ovarian failure.
Combined oxidative phosphorylation deficiency 11	614917	RMND1	A protein involved in mitochondrial translation; associated with additional renal involvement. A subset of those affected had symptoms consistent with Perrault syndrome.

== Diagnosis ==
Because of the inability of the streak gonads to produce sex hormones (both estrogens and androgens), most of the secondary sex characteristics do not develop. This is especially true of estrogenic changes such as breast development, widening of the pelvis and hips, and menstrual periods. Because the adrenal glands can make limited amounts of androgens and are not affected by this syndrome, most of these individuals will develop pubic hair, though it often remains sparse.

Diagnosis usually occurs after evaluation for a concern of delayed puberty. Next steps involve laboratory studies, such as FSH and LH levels. Other laboratory studies such as testosterone, dehydroepiandrosterone, anti-Mullerian hormone, human chorionic gonadotropin, thyroid-stimulating hormone, and prolactin are a part of some algorithms to investigate primary amenorrhea. Imaging can include a pelvic ultrasound or MRI, which would reveal normal internal genitalia such as a uterus but with streak gonads, which can be small and thus not easily visualized. Genetic testing involves chromosomal analysis via karyotype to confirm XX chromosomes, rather than XO or XY as discussed in related syndromes above.

== Treatment ==
Treatment involves hormone replacement therapy that mirrors physiologic levels that would be otherwise provided by functional ovaries. Induction of puberty and menstruation relies on estrogen, which can be given in oral or transdermal forms. Estrogen also has protective effects against osteopenia/osteoporosis as well as cardiovascular health and urogenital atrophy later in life. Progesterone therapy is added after 12 months of estrogen or after menstruation has begun, whichever comes first, which decreases the risk of endometrial hyperplasia and subsequent cancer. Combined oral contraceptives can also be used.

In terms of fertility, pregnancy could be facilitated through egg donation and in vitro fertilization, as individuals with XX gonadal dysgenesis still have a functional uterus.

== Prognosis ==
Prognosis is dependent on whether these individuals have any comorbidities or if the gonadal dysgenesis is a part of a syndrome. For example, if an individual has gonadal dysgenesis as a part of WAGR syndrome, there is a significant effect on morbidity (i.e., intellectual disabilities, chronic kidney disease, vision impairment) and mortality (i.e., Wilms tumor). Without other somatic stigmata, XX gonadal dysgenesis complications include effects on fertility and other comorbidities generally associated with primary ovarian insufficiency. Similar to individuals experiencing menopause, the low estrogen state can lead to atrophic vaginitis, which is associated with vaginal irritation, dryness, pain during sex, or pain while urinating. Estrogen is also essential in as bone growth and development, so for adolescents with primary ovarian insufficiency, they may have lower levels of bone mineral density. Cardiovascular disease risk affects both morbidity and mortality—estrogen plays regulatory roles in lipid metabolism, endothelial function, insulin resistance, and inflammatory markers. Sexual and reproductive dysfunction from primary ovarian insufficiency has been associated with increased levels of depression, anxiety, low self-esteem, and psychosocial stress.

== History ==
The first described case of pure gonadal dysgenesis was in 1960, in a patient with presumed Turner syndrome but without the expected stigmata. In 1951, Perrault, Klotz, and Housset reported the association of gonadal dysgenesis and deafness in two sisters, and this presentation is now called Perrault syndrome.

== See also ==
- Disorders of sex development
- Gonadal dysgenesis
- Sex chromosome anomalies
- Turner syndrome
- XY gonadal dysgenesis
