= DNA repair-scaffolding protein =

Protein found in humans

SPIDR

Identifiers
- Aliases: SPIDR, KIAA0146, scaffolding protein involved in DNA repair
- External IDs: OMIM: 615384; MGI: 1924834; GeneCards: SPIDR

Gene location (Mouse)
Chr.	Chromosome 16 (mouse)
Band	16|16 A2	Start	15,707,088 bp
Band	16|16 A2	End	15,964,715 bp
Gene ontology
Molecular function	protein binding
Cellular component	nuclear chromosome; nucleus; nucleoplasm
Biological process	cellular response to ionizing radiation; regulation of establishment of protein localization to chromosome; positive regulation of double-strand break repair; DNA recombination; cellular response to camptothecin; positive regulation of protein-containing complex assembly; cellular response to hydroxyurea; regulation of double-strand break repair via homologous recombination; cellular response to DNA damage stimulus; DNA repair; double-strand break repair via homologous recombination
Sources:Amigo / QuickGO
Orthologs
Databases	NCBI: entry; OMA: entry
Species	Human	Mouse
Entrez	23514	224008
Ensembl	ENSG00000164808	ENSMUSG00000041974
UniProt	Q14159	Q8BGX7
RefSeq (mRNA)	NM_001080394; NM_001282916; NM_001282919	NM_146068; NM_001355731
RefSeq (protein)	NP_001073863; NP_001269845; NP_001269848; NP_001339860; NP_001339861 NP_001339862; NP_001339863; NP_001339864; NP_001339865; NP_001339866; NP_001339867; NP_001339868; NP_001339869; NP_001339870; NP_001339871; NP_001339872; NP_001339873; NP_001339874; NP_001339875; NP_001339876; NP_001339877; NP_001339878; NP_001339879; NP_001339880; NP_001339881; NP_001339882; NP_001339884; NP_001339885; NP_001339886; NP_001339887; NP_001339888; NP_001339889; NP_001339890	NP_666180; NP_001342660
Location (UCSC)	n/a	Chr 16: 15.71 – 15.96 Mb
PubMed search
- Wikidata
View/Edit Human	View/Edit Mouse

DNA repair-scaffolding protein is a protein that in humans is encoded by the SPIDR gene (previously KIAA0146). This protein is involved in DNA repair, in particular homologous recombination (HR) for double-strand breaks (DSB). This protein is also called scaffold protein involved in DNA repair, hence the gene symbol SPIDR.

== Function ==
This protein forms protein complex with SWSAP1 and ZSWIM7 called the Shu complex. This complex functions to stabilize RAD51 and DMC1 filaments on DNA, and the DMC1 stabilization is essential during meiosis. It is also needed for certain types of DNA repair like inter-homolog homologous recombination (IH-HR), where a double-strand break (DSB) is repaired using the homologous chromosome instead of the sister chromatid.

== Medical significance ==
Pathogenic mutations in SPIDR are associated with severe dysfunction of the ovaries, and potentially their complete absence, called Ovarian dysgenesis-9 (ODG9). Chromosomal instability has also been noted in some individuals.
