= Leucine–tRNA ligase, mitochondrial =

Enzyme found in humans

LARS2

Identifiers
- Aliases: LARS2, LEURS, PRLTS4, mtLeuRS, leucyl-tRNA synthetase 2, mitochondrial, HLASA
- External IDs: OMIM: 604544; MGI: 2142973; GeneCards: LARS2
Enzyme activity
EC #	BRENDA	ExPASy	KEGG	MetaCyc
6.1.1.4	↗	↗	↗	↗

Gene location (Human)
Chr.	Chromosome 3 (human)
Band	3p21.31	Start	45,388,561 bp
Band	3p21.31	End	45,554,726 bp

Gene location (Mouse)
Chr.	Chromosome 9 (mouse)
Band	9 F4|9 73.92 cM	Start	123,195,992 bp
Band	9 F4|9 73.92 cM	End	123,291,731 bp
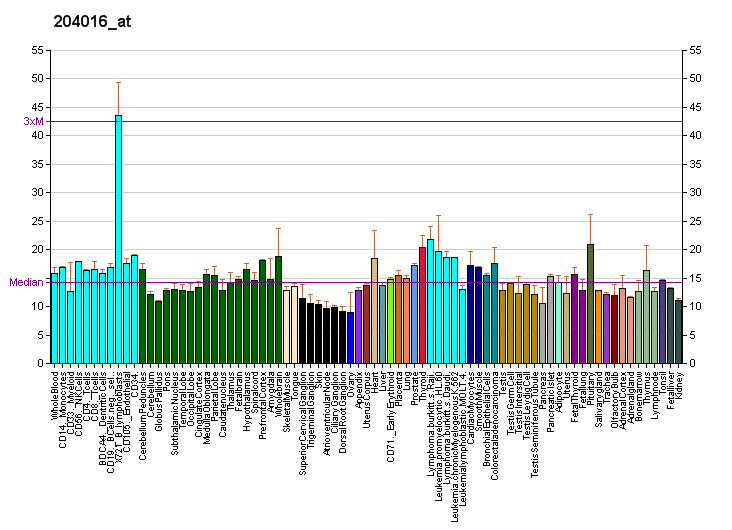

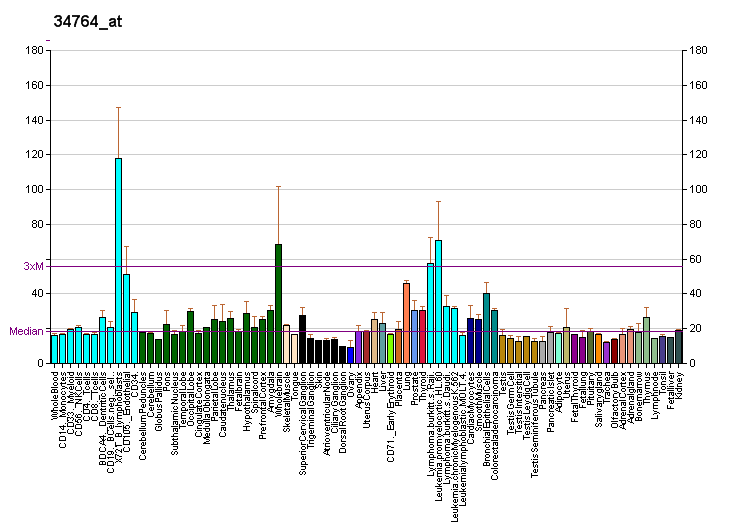
RNA expression pattern
Bgee	Human / Mouse (ortholog); Top expressed in: ventricular zone; oocyte; secondary oocyte; Brodmann area 23; mucosa of transverse colon; kidney tubule; caudate nucleus; retinal pigment epithelium; prefrontal cortex; ganglionic eminence / Top expressed in: zygote; yolk sac; lip; superior frontal gyrus; spermatocyte; muscle of thigh; tail of embryo; ventricular zone; genital tubercle; neural tube; More reference expression data
BioGPS	More reference expression data
Gene ontology
Molecular function	aminoacyl-tRNA ligase activity; nucleotide binding; ligase activity; ATP binding; aminoacyl-tRNA editing activity; leucine-tRNA ligase activity
Cellular component	mitochondrial matrix; mitochondrion
Biological process	tRNA aminoacylation for protein translation; protein biosynthesis; leucyl-tRNA aminoacylation; mitochondrial translation; aminoacyl-tRNA metabolism involved in translational fidelity
Sources:Amigo / QuickGO
Orthologs
Databases	NCBI: entry; OMA: entry
Species	Human	Mouse
Entrez	23395	102436
Ensembl	ENSG00000011376	ENSMUSG00000035202
UniProt	Q15031	Q8VDC0
RefSeq (mRNA)	NM_015340; NM_001368263	NM_153168; NM_001348167; NM_001348168
RefSeq (protein)	NP_056155; NP_001355192	NP_694808; NP_001335096; NP_001335097
Location (UCSC)	Chr 3: 45.39 – 45.55 Mb	Chr 9: 123.2 – 123.29 Mb
PubMed search
- Wikidata
View/Edit Human	View/Edit Mouse

Leucine–tRNA ligase, mitochondrial, also called leucyl-tRNA synthetase 2, mitochondrial, is an enzyme that in humans is encoded by the LARS2 gene. Like leucine–tRNA ligase, cytoplasmic (LARS1), this enzyme functions as a leucine–tRNA ligase, meaning it binds the amino acid leucine to the corresponding transfer RNA, tRNA^{Leu}, as part of protein synthesis.

== Function ==
This enzyme is a class 1 aminoacyl-tRNA synthetase. It participates in RNA-to-protein translation by binding the amino acid leucine to the corresponding transfer RNA, tRNA^{Leu}.

== Medical significance ==
Pathogenic (homozygous or compound heterozygous) mutations in LARS2 are associated with deafness and ovarian disgenesis, called Perrault syndrome-4 (PRLTS4). In some cases, people with certain pathogenic (compound heterozygous) mutations suffer from more severe symptoms starting in the womb such as anemia and hydrops (fluid build-up), and breathing difficulties after birth which can lead to death. This more severe syndrome is called hydrops, lactic acidosis, and sideroblastic anemia (HLASA)
