= Leucine–tRNA ligase =

Class of enzymes

Identifiers
- EC no.: 6.1.1.4
- CAS no.: 9031-15-6

Databases
- BRENDA: enzyme data
- ExPASy: NiceZyme view
- KEGG: enzyme entry
- MetaCyc: metabolic pathway
- Rhea: reactions
- PDB structures: RCSB PDB PDBe PDBsum
- Gene Ontology: AmiGO / QuickGO
Search
- PMC: articles
- PubMed: articles
- NCBI: proteins

In enzymology, a leucine–tRNA ligase (EC 6.1.1.4) is an enzyme that catalyzes the chemical reaction

ATP + L-leucine + tRNA^{Leu} $\rightleftharpoons$ AMP + diphosphate + L-leucyl-tRNA^{Leu}

The 3 substrates of this enzyme are ATP, L-leucine, and tRNA^{Leu}, whereas its 3 products are AMP, diphosphate, and L-leucyl-tRNA^{Leu}.

There are two isozymes found in humans, encoded by the genes LARS1 and LARS2. This enzyme belongs to the family of ligases, to be specific those forming carbon–oxygen bonds in aminoacyl-tRNA and related compounds. The systematic name of this enzyme class is L-leucine:tRNA^{Leu} ligase (AMP-forming). Other names in common use include leucyl-tRNA synthetase, leucyl-transfer ribonucleate synthetase, leucyl-transfer RNA synthetase, leucyl-transfer ribonucleic acid synthetase, leucine-tRNA synthetase, and leucine translase. This enzyme participates in valine, leucine and isoleucine biosynthesis and aminoacyl-tRNA biosynthesis.

== Structural studies ==
As of late 2007, 5 structures have been solved for this class of enzymes, with PDB accession codes PDB: 1WKB, PDB: 1WZ2, PDB: 2AJG, PDB: 2AJH, and PDB: 2AJI.
