= BC-LI-0186 =

Chemical compound

Identifiers
- IUPAC name: 4-(2,3-dimethyl-5-oxo-4-propan-2-ylpyrazol-1-yl)-N-(2-phenoxyethyl)benzenesulfonamide
- CAS Number: 695207-56-8
- PubChem CID: 4917788
- ChemSpider: 4099704
- CompTox Dashboard (EPA): DTXSID901336671

Chemical and physical data
- Formula: C_{22}H_{27}N_{3}O_{4}S
- Molar mass: 429.54 g·mol^{−1}
- 3D model (JSmol): Interactive image
- SMILES: CC1=C(C(=O)N(N1C)C2=CC=C(C=C2)S(=O)(=O)NCCOC3=CC=CC=C3)C(C)C
- InChI: InChI=1S/C22H27N3O4S/c1-16(2)21-17(3)24(4)25(22(21)26)18-10-12-20(13-11-18)30(27,28)23-14-15-29-19-8-6-5-7-9-19/h5-13,16,23H,14-15H2,1-4H3; Key:SQYWMHPZMHDCHP-UHFFFAOYSA-N

BC-LI-0186 is a compound that acts as an inhibitor of the GTPase enzyme leucyl-tRNA synthetase (LRS). This enzyme acts as part of the mTOR complex and acts as a leucine sensor which stimulates mTORC1 in the presence of leucine. BC-LI-0186 blocks the docking site for mTORC1 and thereby prevents the mTOR activation and increased protein synthesis which is usually triggered by branched-chain amino acids such as leucine, yet without inhibiting the separate catalytic activity of LRS. This may have potential applications in the treatment of cancer, and BC-LI-0186 has also been shown to promote muscle regeneration after injury.
