= Histidine–tRNA ligase, mitochondrial =

Enzyme found in humans

HARS2

Identifiers
- Aliases: HARS2, HARSL, HARSR, HO3, PRLTS2, histidyl-tRNA synthetase 2, mitochondrial, HisRS
- External IDs: OMIM: 600783; MGI: 1918041; GeneCards: HARS2
Enzyme activity
EC #	BRENDA	ExPASy	KEGG	MetaCyc
6.1.1.21	↗	↗	↗	↗

Gene location (Human)
Chr.	Chromosome 5 (human)
Band	5q31.3	Start	140,691,430 bp
Band	5q31.3	End	140,699,305 bp

Gene location (Mouse)
Chr.	Chromosome 18 (mouse)
Band	18|18 B2	Start	36,916,061 bp
Band	18|18 B2	End	36,925,615 bp
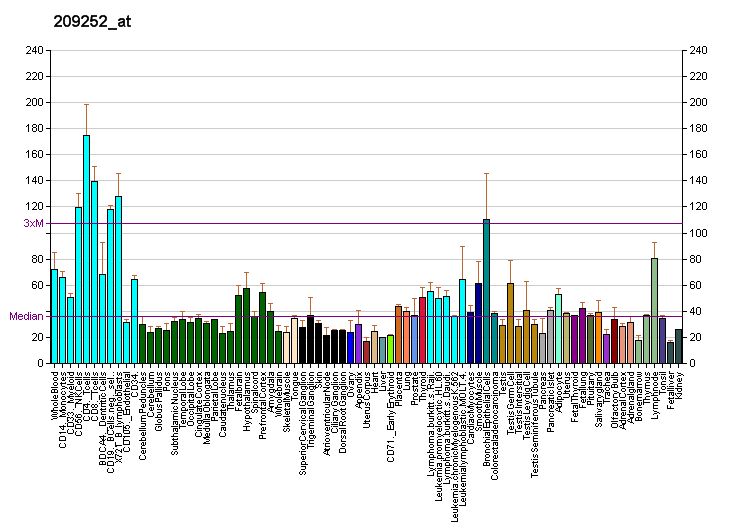
RNA expression pattern
Bgee	Human / Mouse (ortholog); Top expressed in: cerebellar hemisphere; right hemisphere of cerebellum; apex of heart; granulocyte; mucosa of transverse colon; right adrenal cortex; rectum; right uterine tube; body of uterus; right ovary / Top expressed in: neural layer of retina; ventricular zone; spermatocyte; superior frontal gyrus; right kidney; primary visual cortex; granulocyte; thymus; proximal tubule; cerebellar cortex; More reference expression data
BioGPS	More reference expression data
Gene ontology
Molecular function	aminoacyl-tRNA ligase activity; nucleotide binding; ligase activity; protein binding; ATP binding; protein homodimerization activity; histidine-tRNA ligase activity; RNA binding; identical protein binding
Cellular component	cytoplasm; mitochondrial matrix; mitochondrion; cytosol
Biological process	protein biosynthesis; histidyl-tRNA aminoacylation; mitochondrial translation; tRNA aminoacylation for protein translation
Sources:Amigo / QuickGO
Orthologs
Databases	NCBI: entry; OMA: entry
Species	Human	Mouse
Entrez	23438	70791
Ensembl	ENSG00000112855	ENSMUSG00000019143
UniProt	P49590	Q99KK9
RefSeq (mRNA)	NM_001278731; NM_001278732; NM_012208; NM_001363535; NM_001363536	NM_080636; NM_001305627; NM_001360921
RefSeq (protein)	NP_001265660; NP_001265661; NP_036340; NP_001350464; NP_001350465	NP_001292556; NP_542367; NP_001347850
Location (UCSC)	Chr 5: 140.69 – 140.7 Mb	Chr 18: 36.92 – 36.93 Mb
PubMed search
- Wikidata
View/Edit Human	View/Edit Mouse

Histidine–tRNA ligase, mitochondrial is an enzyme that in humans is encoded by the HARS2 gene. This enzyme is a Histidine–tRNA ligase, meaning it attaches the amino acid histidine to the corresponding transfer RNA (tRNA^{His}), as part of RNA-to-protein translation.

== Function ==
Aminoacyl-tRNA synthetases are a class of enzymes that charge tRNAs with their cognate amino acids. The protein encoded by this gene is an enzyme belonging to the class II family of aminoacyl-tRNA synthetases. Functioning in the synthesis of histidyl-transfer RNA, the enzyme plays an accessory role in the regulation of protein biosynthesis. The gene is located in a head-to-head orientation with HARS on chromosome five, where the homologous genes share a bidirectional promoter.

== Medical significance ==
Pathogenic mutations in HARS2 are the cause of type 2 perrault syndrome (PRLTS2), which is associated with deafness, and in 46XX individuals, a failure of the ovaries to develop (leading to streak gonads).

== See also ==
- Histidine–tRNA ligase, cytoplasmic
