= Histidine–tRNA ligase, cytoplasmic =

Enzyme found in humans

HARS1
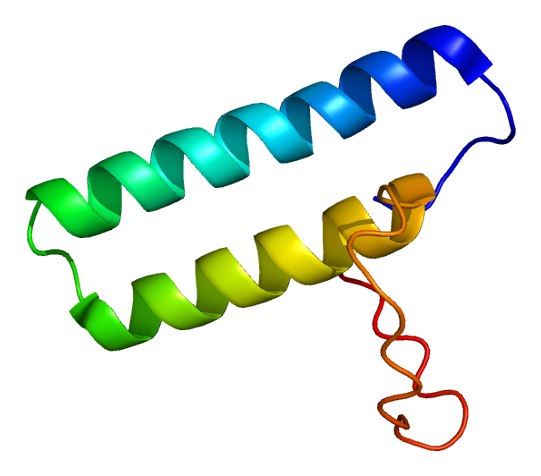

Identifiers
- Aliases: HARS1, HRS, USH3B, CMT2W, histidyl-tRNA synthetase, HARS, histidyl-tRNA synthetase 1
- External IDs: OMIM: 142810; MGI: 108087; GeneCards: HARS1
Available structures
PDB	Ortholog search: PDBe RCSB
PDB	List of PDB id codes 1X59, 2LW7, 4G84, 4G85, 4PHC, 4X5O
Enzyme activity
EC #	BRENDA	ExPASy	KEGG	MetaCyc
6.1.1.21	↗	↗	↗	↗

Gene location (Human)
Chr.	Chromosome 5 (human)
Band	5q31.3	Start	140,673,035 bp
Band	5q31.3	End	140,691,537 bp

Gene location (Mouse)
Chr.	Chromosome 18 (mouse)
Band	18|18 B2	Start	36,899,581 bp
Band	18|18 B2	End	36,916,258 bp
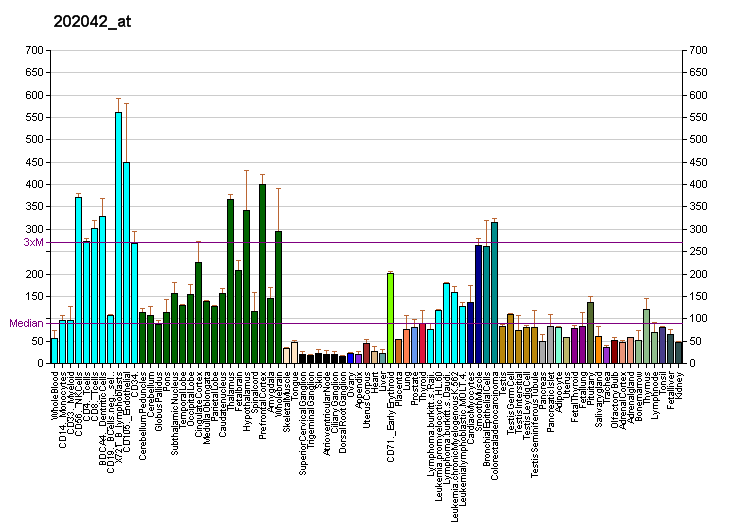
RNA expression pattern
Bgee	Human / Mouse (ortholog); Top expressed in: lateral nuclear group of thalamus; right frontal lobe; anterior pituitary; pars compacta; pars reticulata; right hemisphere of cerebellum; Brodmann area 9; nucleus accumbens; putamen; caudate nucleus / Top expressed in: ureter; cingulate gyrus; primitive streak; fetal liver hematopoietic progenitor cell; medial vestibular nucleus; medullary collecting duct; lateral hypothalamus; epiblast; medial dorsal nucleus; dentate gyrus of hippocampal formation granule cell; More reference expression data
BioGPS	More reference expression data
Gene ontology
Molecular function	aminoacyl-tRNA ligase activity; nucleotide binding; ligase activity; ATP binding; histidine-tRNA ligase activity; identical protein binding
Cellular component	cytoplasm; mitochondrion; cytosol
Biological process	tRNA aminoacylation for protein translation; protein biosynthesis; mitochondrial translation; histidyl-tRNA aminoacylation
Sources:Amigo / QuickGO
Orthologs
Databases	NCBI: entry; OMA: entry
Species	Human	Mouse
Entrez	3035	15115
Ensembl	ENSG00000170445	ENSMUSG00000001380
UniProt	P12081	Q61035
RefSeq (mRNA)	NM_002109; NM_001258040; NM_001258041; NM_001258042; NM_001289092 NM_001289093; NM_001289094	NM_008214
RefSeq (protein)	NP_001244969; NP_001244970; NP_001244971; NP_001276021; NP_001276022 NP_001276023; NP_002100	NP_032240
Location (UCSC)	Chr 5: 140.67 – 140.69 Mb	Chr 18: 36.9 – 36.92 Mb
PubMed search
- Wikidata
View/Edit Human	View/Edit Mouse

Histidine–tRNA ligase, cytoplasmic, also called histidyl-tRNA synthetase 1, is an enzyme which in humans is encoded by the HARS1 gene (previously HARS). As a histidine–tRNA ligase, this enzyme functions to attach the amino acid histidine to its corresponding (cognate) transfer RNA (tRNA^{His}), which is required for RNA-to-protein translation.

== Function ==
Aminoacyl-tRNA synthetases are a class of enzymes that charge tRNAs with their cognate amino acids. The protein encoded by this gene is a cytoplasmic enzyme which belongs to the class II family of aminoacyl tRNA synthetases. The enzyme is responsible for the synthesis of histidyl-transfer RNA, which is essential for the incorporation of histidine into proteins. The gene is located in a head-to-head orientation with HARS2 on chromosome five, where the homologous genes share a bidirectional promoter.

== Clinical significance ==
The gene product is a frequent target of autoantibodies in the human autoimmune disease polymyositis/dermatomyositis. Pathogenic mutations in HARS1 are the cause of Type IIIB usher syndrome (USH3B), which is associated with progressive hearing and vision loss.

== Interactions ==
HARS has been shown to interact with EEF1B2 and EEF1G.

== See also ==
- Histidine–tRNA ligase, mitochondrial
