= Anti-Jo1 =

Anti-nuclear antibody

The Anti-Jo1 autoantibody is an anti-aminoacyl-tRNA synthetase (anti-ARS) antibody that targets its antigen, an enzyme called histidyl-tRNA synthetase (HARS) found in the cytoplasm of cells. HARS is a type of aminoacyl-tRNA synthetase that links the amino acids to transfer RNA (tRNAs) and is thus necessary for translating genetic information into functional proteins. Specifically, HARS connects the amino acid histidine to its proper tRNA section, but if anti-Jo1 binds to HARS and inhibits its function, the body is often led to the autoimmune disease anti-Jo1 syndrome. Anti-Jo1 syndrome is the most common type of antisynthetase syndrome (ASS), a rare autoimmune muscle disease that forms a subgroup of idiopathic inflammatory myositis (IIM). There are a number of anti-ARS antibodies against aminoacyl-tRNA synthetases that contribute to ASS, but anti-Jo1 syndrome is the most prevalent since anti-Jo1 is present in an estimated 70-90% of those who have both interstitial lung disease (ILD) and myositis. Because of its abundance, it is used as a serological marker for diagnosing ASS. Patients with ASS often have connective tissue disease-associated ILD, and, therefore, the test has prognostic value. The reason for this association is not fully understood, but evidence suggests that histidyl-tRNA synthetase possesses immune functions beyond protein synthesis. Following cellular injury, extracellular HARS may act as a cytokine-like molecule that promotes inflammatory cell recruitment and immune activation. Subsequent studies have demonstrated that both innate and adaptive immune responses contribute to the development of antisynthetase syndrome, although the precise events that initiate the autoimmune response remain unknown.

== History ==
Anti-Jo1 antibodies were first identified in 1980 by Nishikai and Reichlin during the evaluation of a patient with polymyositis and interstitial pulmonary fibrosis. The autoantibody was named "Jo-1" after the patient's initials "John P.," whose serum served as the prototype for its discovery. Initially identified as a precipitating antibody using Ouchterlony double immunodiffusion, subsequent studies demonstrated that its target antigen was the HARS enzyme. Since its discovery, extensive research has established anti-Jo1 as the most common myositis-specific autoantibody (MSA), meaning it is rarely detected outside idiopathic inflammatory myopathies and therefore provides high diagnostic specificity.

== Immunopathogenesis ==
The precise immunopathogenesis of anti-Jo1-associated antisynthetase syndrome (ASS) remains incompletely understood. Although HARS is primarily known for its role in protein synthesis, increasing evidence suggests that it also participates in immune regulation. HARS is expressed at increased levels in regenerating skeletal muscle fibers and bronchial epithelial cells, which may help explain why skeletal muscle and the lungs are the primary target organs in anti-Jo1-associated disease. Following muscle injury or cellular stress, HARS may be released into the extracellular environment, where it exhibits cytokine-like properties by activating chemokine receptors on T lymphocytes and immature dendritic cells. This activity promotes the recruitment of inflammatory immune cells to skeletal muscle and lung tissue, potentially perpetuating chronic inflammation.

The development of anti-Jo1 antibodies is thought to involve both innate and adaptive immune responses. Extracellular HARS may function as an autoantigen, stimulating antigen-presenting cells and activating autoreactive CD4⁺ T cells, which subsequently promote B-cell differentiation and production of anti-Jo1 antibodies. In addition, HARS is a substrate for granzyme B, which can generate immunogenic neoepitopes that may contribute to loss of immune tolerance and initiation of the autoimmune response. Although these autoantibodies can inhibit HARS enzymatic activity in vitro, their direct role in tissue injury has not been established, and they are currently considered biomarkers rather than proven mediators of disease.

Genetic susceptibility also appears to contribute to disease development. Anti-Jo1 antibody production is strongly associated with specific human leukocyte antigen (HLA) class II alleles, particularly HLA-DR3 and HLA-DRw52, suggesting that antigen presentation influences the autoimmune response. Environmental factors may also contribute to disease initiation in genetically susceptible individuals. In particular, smoking has been associated with anti-Jo1-positive disease in individuals carrying the HLA-DRB1*03:01 allele, supporting the hypothesis that pulmonary injury may promote loss of immune tolerance and initiation of the autoimmune response. Additionally, anti-Jo1 antibodies recognize multiple epitopes on HARS, and the diversity of antibody targets among patients supports the concept of epitope spreading, in which the immune response broadens over time following continued tissue injury and antigen release. Despite these advances, the environmental triggers that initiate anti-Jo1 autoimmunity remain unknown, and current evidence suggests that genetic predisposition, immune dysregulation, and tissue damage collectively contribute to the pathogenesis of antisynthetase syndrome.

Emerging evidence also suggests that post-translational modifications of anti-Jo1 antibodies may influence disease pathogenesis. Those positive for anti-Jo1 antibodies exhibit a distinct IgG Fc-glycan profile characterized by increased agalactosylation and reduced bisected and afucosylated glycans, changes associated with a more pro-inflammatory immune phenotype. Although the functional significance of these glycosylation changes remains under investigation, they may contribute to the immunopathogenesis of antisynthetase syndrome.

== Clinical significance ==
Patients with anti-Jo1 antibodies commonly present with a characteristic clinical phenotype that is associated with one or a combination of inflammatory myopathy, interstitial lung disease (ILD), inflammatory arthritis, Raynaud phenomenon, fever, and hyperkeratotic fissuring of the fingers, known as mechanic's hands. Similar hyperkeratotic fissuring may also occur on the plantar surfaces of the feet, called "Hiker's feet", which is also associated with antisynthetase syndrome. Although these symptoms often occur together, patients may initially present with only one feature, with additional manifestations developing over time. In order to diagnose ASS, a patient must have the presence of anti-ARS antibodies, along with either two major or one major and two minor symptoms. Major criteria include ILD and polymyositis (PM) or dermatomyositis (DM), while minor criteria include mechanic's hands, Raynaud's syndrome, and polyarthritis (inflammation of many joints). Nailfold capillaroscpoy may also demonstrate systemic sclerosis-like abnormalities including reduced capillary density, giant capillaries, microhemorrhages, and avascular areas, even in patients without Raynaud phenomenon. Possible other symptoms include weight loss, fatigue, fevers, muscle pain, and rashes.

Among the clinical features that can be attributed to anti-Jo1 antibodies, interstitial lung disease (ILD) represents the main factor determining morbidity and mortality. In some patients, pulmonary involvement can precede muscle weakness or can exist by itself. This can lead to a delay in diagnosis. Thus, detection of anti-Jo1 antibodies in a patient's serum requires additional investigation to reveal the presence of ILD using pulmonary function testing and high-resolution computed tomography (HRCT). Several studies have demonstrated that patients with anti-Jo1 antibodies may initially present with ILD before developing clinically apparent myositis. Because pulmonary disease often determines long-term prognosis, clinicians should consider anti-Jo1 testing in patients with unexplained ILD even in the absence of muscle weakness. Although anti-Jo1 antibodies are found in only 20-30% of polymyositis patients, these antibodies are highly specific to IIMs and, thus, their presence represents a good diagnostic marker. Moreover, the level of anti-Jo1 antibodies is related to disease activity; hence, serial tests of antibody titer can be used to monitor the effectiveness of therapy and disease course. Compared with patients carrying other antisynthetase antibodies, anti-Jo1-positive patients generally exhibit a more recognizable clinical phenotype. Recent studies have also suggested that anti-Jo1-positive patients may experience a higher frequency of cardiac involvement than patients with other antisynthetase antibodies. Although cardiac manifestations are less common than pulmonary or muscular disease, these findings show the importance of comprehensive cardiovascular evaluation when clinically indicated. In addition, anti-Jo1-positive patients may have a more favorable overall prognosis. However, long-term outcomes remain largely dependent on the severity of pulmonary involvement and the patient's response to immunosuppressive therapy. Also, patients with anti-Jo1 antibodies are more prone to flare-ups if immunosuppressive therapy is reduced. As antibodies can be present before the development of muscle disease, testing for anti-Jo1 antibodies can also be performed in patients with ILD, inflammatory arthritis, or Raynaud phenomenon.

== Laboratory diagnosis ==
Detection of anti-Jo1 antibodies plays a central role in the diagnosis of antisynthetase syndrome (ASS) and idiopathic inflammatory myopathies (IIMs). Several laboratory methods are available for identifying anti-Jo1 antibodies, including enzyme-linked immunosorbent assay (ELISA), immunoblotting (Western blot), counterimmunoelectrophoresis (CIE), and immunoprecipitation (IP). While immunoprecipitation is considered the reference standard due to its high specificity and ability to detect antibodies against native histidyl-tRNA synthetase, its routine use is limited by technical complexity and restricted availability; ELISA and immunoblotting are more often used in clinical settings. ELISA provides high sensitivity and is well suited for routine screening, whereas immunoblotting serves as a useful confirmatory test by detecting antibodies directed against specific HARS epitopes.

Antinuclear antibody (ANA) testing by indirect immunofluorescence is frequently used as an initial screening test for autoimmune diseases. It has limited sensitivity for anti-Jo1 antibodies. Many patients with anti-Jo1 antibodies have only weak cytoplasmic fluorescence, and some may even have a false-negative ANA result. Specific anti-Jo1 antibody testing is recommended whenever antisynthetase syndrome is suspected based on the patient's clinical presentation. In addition, ELISA can occasionally produce false-positive results, particularly when antibody levels are low. For this reason, positive results are often confirmed using a second method, such as immunoblotting or immunoprecipitation, to improve diagnostic accuracy.

Anti-Jo1 antibodies are highly specific, close to 100%, but only moderately sensitive, approximately 20-30%, for idiopathic inflammatory myopathies. This means that a positive test strongly supports the diagnosis of antisynthetase syndrome or an inflammatory myopathy, while a negative result does not rule out either condition. Because anti-Jo1 antibody levels often reflect disease activity, measuring antibody titers over time can also help clinicians monitor treatment response and disease progression, particularly in patients with active myositis.

Recent proteomic studies have also identified characteristic Fc-glycosylation patterns of anti-Jo1 antibodies, raising the possibility that antibody glycan profiling could become a future biomarker for disease classification or prognosis. However, these techniques remain experimental and are not currently used in routine clinical practice.

== Associated autoantibodies ==
Anti-Jo1 antibodies frequently coexist with anti-Ro52 (Ro52/TRIM21) autoantibodies in patients with idiopathic inflammatory myopathies and antisynthetase syndrome. In one study of 112 patients with idiopathic inflammatory myopathy, anti-Ro52 antibodies were detected in 20% of all patients but were present in 58% of those who were anti-Jo1 positive, suggesting a strong immunologic association between these two autoantibodies. Importantly, this association is not due to cross-reactivity, as anti-Jo1 and anti-Ro52 recognize distinct target antigens. Current evidence suggests that immune responses against histidyl-tRNA synthetase and Ro52 may be immunologically linked, although the mechanisms underlying this association remain unclear. Similarly, a review by Zampieri et al. concluded that the autoimmune responses against these two antigens may be immunologically coupled rather than cross-reactive, supporting a shared mechanism despite their distinct antigenic targets. More recently, a North African cohort confirmed this association in an independent population, demonstrating that anti-Ro52 antibodies were significantly more common among anti-Jo1-positive patients.

Because anti-Ro52 co-positivity has been associated with distinct clinical features, its detection has important prognostic implications. Patients with both anti-Jo1 and anti-Ro52 antibodies have been reported to exhibit a higher frequency of interstitial lung disease (ILD), more severe pulmonary involvement, and a greater likelihood of requiring intensive immunosuppressive therapy compared with patients who are anti-Jo1-positive alone. Some studies have also shown that patients with high anti-Ro52 antibody levels are less responsive to conventional immunosuppressive therapy, suggesting that anti-Ro52 may identify a subset of patients with more aggressive disease. Consequently, testing for anti-Ro52 in individuals with anti-Jo1 antibodies may provide additional prognostic information and assist in risk stratification for pulmonary complications. In a single-center case series, pulmonary fibrosis on chest CT was observed significantly more often in anti-Ro/SSA-positive than anti-Ro/SSA-negative anti-Jo1 patients, supporting the association between anti-Ro52 co-positivity and more severe pulmonary disease. Taken together, these findings support routine testing for anti-Ro52 in anti-Jo1-positive patients because co-positivity provides additional prognostic information, particularly regarding pulmonary disease.

== Treatment of antisynthetase syndrome ==
There is currently no cure for anti-Jo1-associated antisynthetase syndrome, and treatment focuses on suppressing immune-mediated inflammation and preventing irreversible organ damage. High-dose corticosteroids are generally considered first-line therapy and are frequently combined with steroid-sparing immunosuppressive agents such as methotrexate, azathioprine, or mycophenolate mofetil. Patients with severe or progressive ILD may require more aggressive therapies including cyclophosphamide, tacrolimus, rituximab, or intravenous immunoglobulin (IVIG). Although muscle weakness frequently improves with immunosuppressive therapy, pulmonary disease often responds more slowly and remains the principal determinant of long-term outcome. Early combination immunosuppressive therapy may improve pulmonary function in many patients, although progression of pulmonary fibrosis and respiratory failure can still occur. Because interstitial lung disease is the major contributor to morbidity and mortality in anti-Jo1-associated antisynthetase syndrome, a multidisciplinary approach involving both rheumatologists and pulmonologists is recommended.
