= LZTS1 =

Protein-coding gene in the species Homo sapiens

Identifiers
- Aliases: LZTS1, F37, FEZ1, leucine zipper, putative tumor suppressor 1, leucine zipper tumor suppressor 1
- External IDs: OMIM: 606551; MGI: 2684762; HomoloGene: 10873; GeneCards: LZTS1; OMA:LZTS1 - orthologs

Gene location (Human)
Chr.	Chromosome 8 (human)
Band	8p21.3	Start	20,246,165 bp
Band	8p21.3	End	20,303,963 bp

Gene location (Mouse)
Chr.	Chromosome 8 (mouse)
Band	8|8 B3.3	Start	69,585,321 bp
Band	8|8 B3.3	End	69,636,877 bp
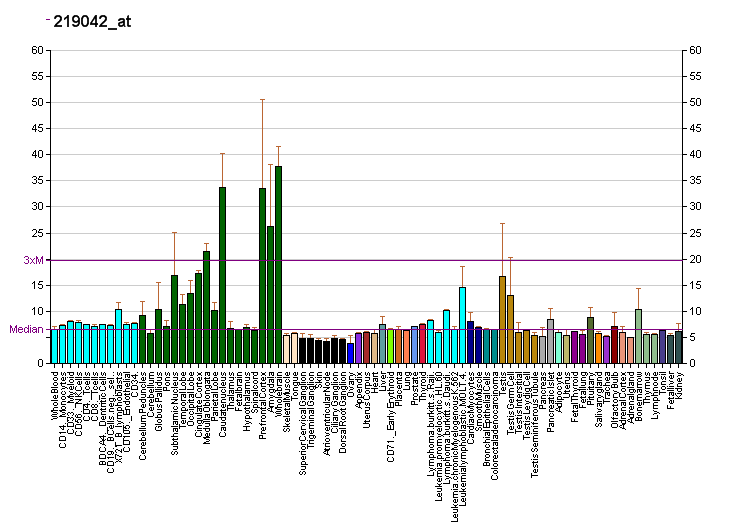

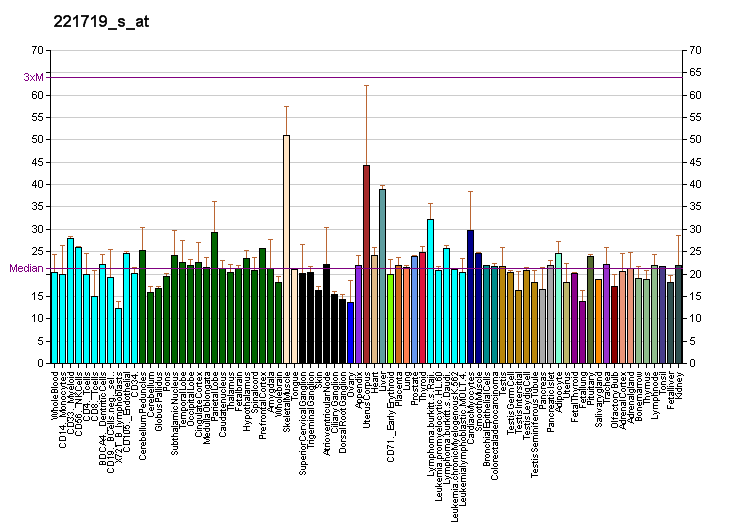

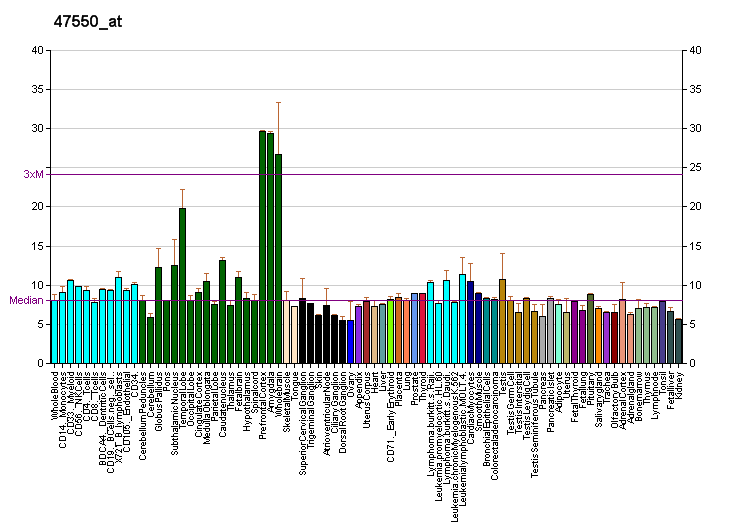
RNA expression pattern
Bgee	Human / Mouse (ortholog); Top expressed in: ganglionic eminence; nucleus accumbens; Brodmann area 23; primary visual cortex; right frontal lobe; caudate nucleus; amygdala; prefrontal cortex; putamen; dorsolateral prefrontal cortex / Top expressed in: olfactory tubercle; piriform cortex; dorsal striatum; Rostral migratory stream; Region I of hippocampus proper; lumbar spinal ganglion; lateral septal nucleus; superior frontal gyrus; nucleus accumbens; primary motor cortex; More reference expression data
BioGPS	More reference expression data
Gene ontology
Molecular function	DNA binding; DNA-binding transcription factor activity; protein binding; microtubule binding
Cellular component	cytoplasm; postsynaptic membrane; cell projection; membrane; postsynaptic density; plasma membrane; dendritic spine; synapse; cell junction; apical plasma membrane; neuron projection; dendritic shaft; cell body
Biological process	negative regulation of macroautophagy; transcription, DNA-templated; cell cycle; regulation of transcription, DNA-templated; mitotic cell cycle phase transition; regulation of synaptic plasticity; regulation of dendrite morphogenesis
Sources:Amigo / QuickGO
Orthologs
Species	Human	Mouse
Entrez	11178	211134
Ensembl	ENSG00000061337	ENSMUSG00000036306
UniProt	Q9Y250	P60853
RefSeq (mRNA)	NM_021020; NM_001362884	NM_199364; NM_001370971
RefSeq (protein)	NP_066300; NP_001349813	NP_955396; NP_001357900
Location (UCSC)	Chr 8: 20.25 – 20.3 Mb	Chr 8: 69.59 – 69.64 Mb
PubMed search
- Wikidata
View/Edit Human	View/Edit Mouse

Leucine zipper putative tumor suppressor 1 is a protein that, in humans, is encoded by the LZTS1 gene.

In melanocytic cells LZTS1 gene expression may be regulated by MITF.

== Interactions ==
LZTS1 has been shown to interact with EEF1G.
