= Malouf syndrome =

- Other names: Dilated cardiomyopathy-hypergonadotropic hypogonadism syndrome Najjar syndrome Cardiogenital syndrome

Malouf syndrome (also known as "congestive cardiomyopathy-hypergonadotropic hypogonadism syndrome") is a congenital disorder that causes one or more of the following symptoms: intellectual disability, ovarian dysgenesis, congestive cardiomyopathy, broad nasal base, blepharoptosis, and bone abnormalities, and occasionally marfanoid habitus (tall stature with long and thin limbs, little subcutaneous fat, arachnodactyly, joint hyperextension, narrow face, small chin, large testes, and hypotonia).

This congenital disease was first classified in 1985 by Dr. Joe Malouf, who performed a case study on two sisters that displayed this rare syndrome. The study consisted of two sisters that presented with hypergonadotropic hypogonadism, dilated cardiomyopathy, blepharoptosis, and a broad nasal base. Upon further analysis of their genetic lineage, it was found that the parents of the sisters were first-degree cousins; Malouf then classified the syndrome as a familial disorder. In 1992, a new case study of an 18-year-old female conducted by Narahara et al. resulted in similar findings as Malouf. Although the prevalence of Malouf syndrome is unknown, there are less than 20 affected families discussed in literature. While there is no specific cure for Malouf syndrome, symptoms can be treated. The treatment options are individualized and should be determined by a doctor or specialist.

== Signs and symptoms ==
The main symptoms of this disease are hypergonadotropic hypogonadism and cardiomyopathy, whose coexistence is extremely rare. It is characterized by a combination of features that can affect the skeletal, cardiovascular, and skin systems.

Symptoms:

- Hypergonadotropic hypogonadism: impaired testicular function. Hypergonadotropic hypogonadism can be acquired or can be present from birth.
- Cardiomyopathy: muscle or electrical dysfunction of the heart which often leads to progressive heart failure. There are many different types of cardiomyopathies. Cardiomyopathies are usually asymptomatic in the early stages, but can have similar symptoms to heart failure such as shortness of breath, fatigue, cough, orthopnea, dyspnea, and edema. Treatment is based on the patients symptoms and on whether it is obstructive or nonobstructive. There are many different approaches to treatment strategies for cardiomyopathies.
- Dilated cardiomyopathy: identified by presence of left ventricular dilation and contractile dysfunction. Genetic mutations such as Malouf syndrome account for 35% of the cases of dilated cardiomyopathy. Symptoms of dilated cardiomyopathy are similar to congestive heart failure.
- Blepharoptosis: a common eyelid disorder which causes an abnormally low or drooping of one or both upper eyelids. Symptoms of blepharoptosis range from an asymptomatic cosmetic effect to significant visual deficits. There are several different classifications of blepharoptosis.
- Broad nasal base: while this may be perfectly normal in certain individuals, it can also be a symptom of a congenital disorder
- Marfanoid habitus: a congenital syndrome that is physically characterized by long limbs and a flat face that may resemble Marfan syndrome along with learning and motor disabilities
- Metabolic abnormalities
- Thyroid hemiagenisis: a rare congenital abnormality of the thyroid gland characterized by the absence of one lobe
- Aged appearance of the feet
- Diabetes mellitus: chronic metabolic disorder reducing the ability for and individual to regulate the level of glucose in their blood stream. There are several classifications of diabetes mellitus. These classifications include type 1 diabetes, type 2 diabetes, maturity-onset diabetes of the young, gestational diabetes, neonatal diabetes, and steroid-induced diabetes. The initial treatment to diabetes mellitus is through lifestyle modifications through physical activity and diet changes. When these non-pharmacologic approaches do not result in normalization of the metabolic abnormalities, there are several different pharmacologic therapies that are available.
- Collagenoma: rare collections of malformed cells that are densely composed of collagen This is usually treated by resection or electrical cauterizations, but it varies from patient to patient.
- Ovarian dysgenesis (female): females with ovarian dysgenesis do not have germ cells. They do however have the female phenotype, but they lack sexual characteristics.
- Hypoplastic genitalia: underdeveloped genitalia
- Undescended testis (males): also known as cryptorchidism. Undescended testis is a condition in which the testicles fail to descend into the scrotum. It is a common birth defect and surgical treatment is the recommended option. For children, the surgery is an orchiopexy. For adults with undescended testis, the treatment approach is an orchiectomy in which one or both testicles are surgically removed. If left untreated, fertility disorders may occur.
- Micropenis (males): clinically diagnosed as 2.5 standard deviations of the mean in a patient with normal internal and external male genitalia.
- Small testis (males): clinically defined as testes that are smaller than the 50th percentile for age.

Note: it is possible that males with Malouf syndrome display cardiomyopathy but not testicular dysgenesis

== Genetics ==
Malouf syndrome involves an autosomal recessive inheritance pattern in that it is a recessive trait that is inherited. It is caused by a heterozygous missense mutation in the LMNA gene located on chromosome 1 (1q22). The person inherits two copies of this mutation from both of the parents - meaning both parents are carriers of this mutation - leading to the development of the syndrome. The LMNA gene encodes for lamin A and lamin C which are important proteins produced by almost every type of cell in the body. The lamin family of proteins are components of the nuclear lamina that consists of a protein network within the inner nuclear membrane that determine nuclear stability, chromatin structure and gene expression. Mutations in this gene can lead to several diseases besides Malouf syndrome, such as familial partial lipodystrophy, limb girdle muscular dystrophy, and Hutchinson-Gilford progeria syndrome, therefore making it harder to distinguish whether a patient is displaying signs of Malouf syndrome or some other disease. The LMNA mutation can show up in many different tissues including cardiac, skeletal, nervous, adipose, and cutaneous tissue.

The most common heterozygous mutations found in the LMNA gene are a heterozygous de novo ala57-to-pro substitution (A57P), which means the Alanine amino acid at position 57 was substituted by a Proline, resulting from a 584G-C transversion in the LMNA gene and a de novo 176T-C transition in exon 1 leading to a leu59-to-arg (L59R) substitution.

Further genetic research and advanced molecular techniques are necessary to identify the specific genetic defects and pathways involved in Malouf syndrome. The genetic basis of Malouf syndrome remains incompletely understood, contributing to challenges in diagnosis and management.

== Diagnosis ==
There is no set criteria used to diagnose Malouf syndrome. Signs and symptoms such as congestive or dilated cardiomyopathy, ovarian dysgenesis in females or primary testicular failure in males, intellectual disability, broad nasal base, blepharoptosis, skin lesions, and skeletal abnormalities are used as a reference to diagnosis this rare disease, and genetic testing of the LMNA gene can serve as a way to confirm a diagnosis.

Malouf syndrome was first diagnosed in 1985 by Dr. Joe Malouf. Dr. Malouf examined two sisters who exhibited congestive cardiomyopathy associated with ovarian dysgenesis, secondary hypergonadotropic hypogonadism, bilateral ptosis, and prominent nasal bones. Dr. Malouf noted that this disease is familial - and therefore congenital - as the two sisters were children of first degree cousins.

In 1992, Kouji Narahara examined an 18-year-old girl who displayed the same symptoms seen by Dr. Malouf in his patients. She was described as having delayed intellectual development, mild cardiomegaly, broad nasal base and several signs of Marfan syndrome such as small stature, arachnodactyly, and a large arm span. With further testing, it was found that she had several electrocardiography (ECG) deviations which were concluded to be left-side dilated cardiomyopathy and congestive heart failure. In addition to cardiomyopathy, many of her reproductive organs were also significantly impacted such as hypoplasia of her uterus, vagina, and fallopian tubes. Dr. Narahara was able to conclude that the girl had Malouf syndrome because it is extremely rare to see gonadal dysgenesis and cardiomyopathy in the same patient, which both his patient and Dr. Malouf's patients exhibited.

Diagnosis of this syndrome is sometimes conflicting as the symptoms displayed match those of other diseases such as limb girdle muscular dystrophy, Hutchinson-Gilford progeria syndrome, Noonan syndrome et cetera. As a result, it has been often questioned as to whether Malouf syndrome truly is a new syndrome that should be accepted.

In particular, Noonan syndrome has been the most significant condition that is considered in the differential diagnosis of Malouf syndrome because of the similarity in its signs and clinical manifestations to those of Malouf syndrome. However, certain fundamental signs and symptoms that are unique only to Malouf syndrome were able to be the distinguishing factor in diagnosis. Some of these signs and symptoms include small stature, abnormalities of the thorax, and a webbed neck.

Despite all of this, providers are strongly encouraged to keep Malouf syndrome in mind with the differential diagnosis of dilated cardiomyopathy until further evidence is discovered which will lead to a more guided approach to diagnosing patients.

=== Differential diagnosis ===
Due to the clinically overlapping characteristics, distinguishing Malouf syndrome from other diseases can be challenging. For instance, Malouf syndrome shares similarities with Marfan syndrome, such as a tall and slender build, long limbs, and mitral valve prolapse, making it difficult to differentiate between the two based solely on physical examination. Additionally, other connective tissue disorders like Ehlers-Danlos syndrome, Loeys-Dietz syndrome, and homocystinuria can present with overlapping features such as hypermobility, skin laxity, and cardiovascular anomalies. Therefore, a thorough clinical evaluation, including detailed medical history and, where possible, genetic testing, is crucial for an accurate diagnosis and appropriate management.

- Ehlers-Danlos syndrome: The Ehlers–Danlos syndromes (EDS) are a diverse group of genetic connective tissue disorders impacting collagen production and function, characterized by symptoms such as joint hypermobility, tissue fragility, and severe cardiovascular issues like arterial aneurysms and organ rupture. The updated classification now recognizes 13 subtypes, including hypermobile EDS (hEDS), which is distinguished from hypermobility spectrum disorders (HSD) and has a higher risk of systemic complications. While serious cardiovascular problems are common in some EDS types, hEDS typically features only mild, nonprogressive thoracic aortic dilatation and mitral valve prolapse.
- Loeys–Dietz syndrome: Loeys-Dietz syndrome (LDS) is an autosomal dominant connective tissue disorder with systemic involvement, including craniofacial, skeletal, cutaneous, and vascular abnormalities such as arterial tortuosity and aneurysms. The full clinical spectrum of LDS is not yet fully understood due to limited large-scale studies. The prevalence of LDS is also unknown, with current knowledge based on small cohorts and case reports.
- Homocystinuria: Homocystinuria (HCU) is a rare, autosomal recessive trait that results in the inability to metabolize or break down the amino acid methionine. If methionine is unable to be processed, it will build up in the body which can cause serious toxicities such as seizures, high risk of developing blood clotting disorders, and even intellectual disabilities which often align with the symptoms of Malouf syndrome.
- Marfan syndrome: Marfan syndrome (MFS) is an autosomal dominant systemic connective tissue disorder with variable penetrance, characterized by a range of clinical manifestations. The most serious complications are cardiovascular, including mitral valve prolapse, aortic insufficiency, aortic root dilatation, and aortic dissection. Current efforts focus on improving detection, diagnosis, and treatment based on recent genetic and clinical research findings.

== Management ==
Due to the rare nature of the disease, it has been difficult to understand any underlying mechanisms that cause Malouf syndrome. At its current state, there are no specific treatment regimens or therapies to specifically address Malouf syndrome. However, there are ways to manage the symptoms associated with the disease and other lamin-associated dilated cardiomyopathies. Specifically, with respect to Lamin A/C (LMNA) cardiomyopathy, the current treatment follows the standard heart failure regimen. As noted by Dr. Zhang et al., the treatment for standard heart failures in relation to LMNA cardiomyopathy uses "beta-blockers, angiotensin-converting enzyme inhibitors or angiotensin receptor blockers, and aldosterone antagonists, but the specific efficacy in this population is undetermined." Depending on the patient's case, treatment may need a variety of medications to address the symptoms.

Drugs: used to treat dilated cardiomyopathy.

Angiotensin-converting enzyme (ACE) inhibitors- This type of medicine enlarges blood vessels and lowers blood pressure in order to improve an individual's blood flow. Some of the side effects are dry cough, low blood pressure, low white blood cell count, and kidney or liver problems. Examples: Lisinopril (Zestril), Benazepril (Lotensin).

Angiotensin II receptor blockers (ARBs)- ARBs are an alternative blood pressure-lowering medication that can be used if a person cannot tolerate ACE inhibitors. Some of the side effects are hyperkalemia, hypotension, and acute renal failure. Examples: Losartan (Cozaar), Olmesartan (Benicar).

Anticoagulants- This type of drug helps in preventing blood clots but can cause bruising or bleeding. Examples: Rivaroxaban (Xarelto), Apixaban (Eliquis), Warfarin (Coumadin).

Sacubitril/Valsartan (Entresto)- This combination drug includes an ARB and ACE inhibitor to help pump blood from your heart to the rest of your body. This drug is mainly for people with chronic heart failure. Common side effects include cough, hyperkalemia, and angioedema.

Beta-blockers- This class of drug slows your heart rate and lowers blood pressure. This medication may also prevent the harmful effects of stress hormones. Some of the side effects of this medication include dizziness, low blood pressure, fatigue, and reduced exercise tolerance. Examples: Metoprolol (Betaloc or Lopressor), Atenolol (Tenormin).

Diuretics- This type of drug removes excess fluid and salt from the body as well as the lungs, as excess fluid in the body can strain the heart by forcing it to pump harder. Some of the side effects include increased urination and hyperkalemia. Examples: Furosemide (Lasix), Hydrochlorothiazide (Microzide).

Digoxin (Lanoxin)- The purpose of this drug is to strengthen heart muscle contractions and slow down the heartbeat. This drug can reduce heart failure symptoms and improve your ability to be more active. The use of digoxin requires frequent monitoring due to its narrow therapeutic window. Some of the side effects include rash, headache, hypokalemia, and arrhythmias.

Ivabradine (Corlanor)- This drug restores normal heartbeat by slowing down and regulating the heart rate. It is indicated for the treatment of stable angina pectoris and heart failure with reduced ejection fraction but has seen an increasing role in treating dilated cardiomyopathy due to its improvement of cardiac function. Some side effects of Ivabradine include bradycardia (slow heart rate), atrial fibrillation, and hypertension.

Therapeutic devices: can be surgically implemented to help treat dilated cardiomyopathy.

Biventricular pacemaker- This device sends out electrical signals in order to control contractions between the left and right ventricles. It is used for people who have heart failure and irregular heartbeats.

Implantable cardioverter-defibrillators (ICD)- Although this device does not treat cardiomyopathy itself, it does help prevent arrhythmias, which are commonly caused by cardiomyopathy. Implantable cardioverter-defibrillators monitor the heartbeat and send electrical shocks to control any rapid or abnormal rhythms. This device can also serve as a pacemaker which works similarly to keep the heart beating at a normal rate and rhythm).

Left ventricular assist devices (LVAD)- This device is attached to the heart and either the abdomen or chest in order to help the weakened heart pump blood. It is usually considered after other approaches have proven unsuccessful and can be used as treatment while waiting for a heart transplant.

Hypergonadotropic hypogonadism hormone replacement therapy:

Hormonal replacement therapy (testosterone, estrogen, progesterone, pituitary hormones, et cetera)- This treatment consists of taking medications containing the hormone that the body is lacking to replace the ones that the body no longer produces. These medications can come in the form of pills, patches, gels, or injections.

Malouf syndrome will require regular monitoring. Due to the nature of the disease, and given the potential for progressive symptoms, ongoing monitoring and evaluation by specialists in cardiology, dermatology, and orthopedics are recommended. Genetic counseling may also be beneficial for affected individuals and their families to understand the inheritance pattern and implications.

In summary, Malouf syndrome is a complex disorder requiring a tailored approach to care. As research advances, further understanding of the genetic underpinnings of this condition may lead to more precise diagnostic tools and targeted therapies.

== Epidemiology ==
The prevalence of Malouf syndrome is unknown at the moment and has not been fully defined. About 20 families from around the world, whose members have cardiogential syndrome, have been found in literature. However, the prevalence of familial dilated cardiomyopathy ranges from 30 to 50% cases, with 40% having an identifiable genetic cause. Dilated cardiomyopathy was originally classified as a rare disease, but the possibility of a familiar substrate was ignored. Dilated cardiomyopathy was later found to be a major cause of heart failure, especially among young patients. Dilated cardiomyopathy began to be identified as a systemic condition rather than an isolated disease. Even despite these major efforts and contributions, the incidence and prevalence of dilated cardiomyopathy remain unknown.
