= Histidine–tRNA ligase =

Class of enzymes

Identifiers
- EC no.: 6.1.1.21
- CAS no.: 9068-78-4
- Alt. names: histidyl tRNA synthetase, Jo-1

Databases
- BRENDA: enzyme data
- ExPASy: NiceZyme view
- KEGG: enzyme entry
- MetaCyc: metabolic pathway
- Rhea: reactions
- PDB structures: RCSB PDB PDBe PDBsum
- Gene Ontology: AmiGO / QuickGO
Search
- PMC: articles
- PubMed: articles
- NCBI: proteins

In enzymology, a histidine–tRNA ligase (EC 6.1.1.21) is an enzyme that catalyzes the chemical reaction

ATP + L-histidine + tRNA^{His} $\rightleftharpoons$ AMP + diphosphate + L-histidyl-tRNA^{His}

The 3 substrates of this enzyme are ATP, L-histidine, and tRNA^{His}, whereas its 3 products are AMP, diphosphate, and L-histidyl-tRNA^{His}.

This enzyme participates in histidine metabolism and aminoacyl-tRNA biosynthesis.

== Nomenclature ==
Histidine–tRNA ligase belongs to the family of ligase enzymes, specifically those forming carbon–oxygen bonds in aminoacyl-tRNA and related compounds. The systematic name of this enzyme class is L-histidine:tRNA^{His} ligase (AMP-forming). Other names in common use include histidyl-tRNA synthetase, histidyl-transfer ribonucleate synthetase, and histidine translase.

== See also ==
- Anti-Jo1
- Histidine–tRNA ligase, cytoplasmic
- Histidine–tRNA ligase, mitochondrial
