= ZSWIM7 =

Protein-coding gene found in humans

Identifiers
- Aliases: ZSWIM7, SWS1, zinc finger SWIM-type containing 7
- External IDs: OMIM: 614535; MGI: 1916997; GeneCards: ZSWIM7

Gene location (Human)
Chr.	Chromosome 17 (human)
Band	17p12	Start	15,976,560 bp
Band	17p12	End	15,999,717 bp

Gene location (Mouse)
Chr.	Chromosome 11 (mouse)
Band	11|11 B2	Start	62,158,050 bp
Band	11|11 B2	End	62,172,201 bp
RNA expression pattern
Bgee	Human / Mouse (ortholog); Top expressed in: tendon of biceps brachii; right adrenal cortex; left adrenal gland; C1 segment; muscle of thigh; left adrenal cortex; gastrocnemius muscle; monocyte; oocyte; prefrontal cortex / Top expressed in: muscle of thigh; spermatocyte; right kidney; seminiferous tubule; plantaris muscle; spermatid; gastrocnemius muscle; quadriceps femoris muscle; extensor digitorum longus muscle; medial head of gastrocnemius muscle; More reference expression data
BioGPS	n/a
Gene ontology
Molecular function	zinc ion binding; protein binding; metal ion binding
Cellular component	Shu complex; nucleus
Biological process	protein stabilization; DNA recombination; double-strand break repair via homologous recombination; DNA repair; cellular response to DNA damage stimulus
Sources:Amigo / QuickGO
Orthologs
Databases	NCBI: entry; OMA: entry
Species	Human	Mouse
Entrez	125150	69747
Ensembl	ENSG00000214941	ENSMUSG00000014243
UniProt	Q19AV6	Q9CWQ2
RefSeq (mRNA)	NM_001042698; NM_001042697	NM_027198
RefSeq (protein)	NP_001036162; NP_001036163	NP_081474
Location (UCSC)	Chr 17: 15.98 – 16 Mb	Chr 11: 62.16 – 62.17 Mb
PubMed search
- Wikidata
View/Edit Human	View/Edit Mouse

Zinc finger SWIM domain-containing protein 7 is a protein that in humans is encoded by the ZSWIM7 gene. This protein interacts with SWSAP1 and SPIDR to form a complex called the Shu complex which is involved in DNA repair. In particular, it participates in DNA double-strand break repair, and is particularly important during meiosis.

== Medical Significance ==
Pathogenic mutations in ZSWIM7 have been associated with infertility. For example, it can cause a type of nonobstructive azoospermia designated spermatogenic failure-71 (SPGF71), following an apparent autosomally recessive pattern of inheritance.
