= MCM8 =

Protein-coding gene in the species Homo sapiens

Identifiers
- Aliases: MCM8, C20orf154, dJ967N21.5, POF10, minichromosome maintenance 8 homologous recombination repair factor
- External IDs: OMIM: 608187; MGI: 1913884; GeneCards: MCM8
Enzyme activity
EC #	BRENDA	ExPASy	KEGG	MetaCyc
5.6.2.4	↗	↗	↗	↗

Gene location (Human)
Chr.	Chromosome 20 (human)
Band	20p12.3	Start	5,950,652 bp
Band	20p12.3	End	5,998,977 bp

Gene location (Mouse)
Chr.	Chromosome 2 (mouse)
Band	2|2 F2	Start	132,658,061 bp
Band	2|2 F2	End	132,686,117 bp
RNA expression pattern
Bgee	Human / Mouse (ortholog); Top expressed in: gonad; buccal mucosa cell; oocyte; testicle; secondary oocyte; trabecular bone; biceps brachii; Skeletal muscle tissue of biceps brachii; ventricular zone; bone marrow cell / Top expressed in: tail of embryo; genital tubercle; epiblast; hand; secondary oocyte; embryo; zygote; ventricular zone; embryo; primary oocyte; More reference expression data
BioGPS	n/a
Gene ontology
Molecular function	ATP binding; hydrolase activity; DNA binding; nucleotide binding; helicase activity; protein binding; chromatin binding; enzyme binding; MutLbeta complex binding; MutSalpha complex binding; MutSbeta complex binding; DNA replication origin binding; single-stranded DNA binding
Cellular component	MCM8-MCM9 complex; nucleus; nucleoplasm; chromosome; MCM complex
Biological process	female gamete generation; DNA repair; male gamete generation; DNA replication; cell cycle; double-strand break repair via homologous recombination; cellular response to DNA damage stimulus; DNA replication initiation; G1/S transition of mitotic cell cycle; recombinational interstrand cross-link repair; protein stabilization; protein localization to chromatin
Sources:Amigo / QuickGO
Orthologs
Databases	NCBI: entry; OMA: entry
Species	Human	Mouse
Entrez	84515	66634
Ensembl	ENSG00000125885	ENSMUSG00000027353
UniProt	Q9UJA3	Q9CWV1
RefSeq (mRNA)	NM_001281520; NM_001281521; NM_001281522; NM_032485; NM_182802	NM_001291054; NM_025676
RefSeq (protein)	NP_001268449; NP_001268450; NP_001268451; NP_115874; NP_877954	NP_001277983; NP_079952
Location (UCSC)	Chr 20: 5.95 – 6 Mb	Chr 2: 132.66 – 132.69 Mb
PubMed search
- Wikidata
View/Edit Human	View/Edit Mouse

DNA replication licensing factor MCM8 is a protein that in humans is encoded by the MCM8 gene.

The protein encoded by this gene is one of the highly conserved mini-chromosome maintenance proteins (MCM) that are essential for the initiation of eukaryotic genome replication. The hexameric protein complex formed by the MCM proteins is a key component of the pre-replication complex (pre_RC) and may be involved in the formation of replication forks and in the recruitment of other DNA replication related proteins. This protein contains the central domain that is conserved among the MCM proteins. This protein has been shown to co-immunoprecipitate with MCM4, 6 and 7, which suggests that it may interact with other MCM proteins and play a role in DNA replication. Alternatively spliced transcript variants encoding distinct isoforms have been described.

== DNA repair ==
MCM8-deficient mice are defective in gametogenesis and display genome instability due to impaired homologous recombination. Male MCM8 (-/-) mice are sterile because spermatocytes are blocked in meiotic prophase I. Female MCM8(-/-) mice have arrested primary follicles and frequently develop ovarian tumors. MCM8 protein forms a complex with MCM9.

In the plant Arabidopsis thaliana, MCM8 is required for a pathway of meiotic DNA double-strand break repair. It was proposed that MCM8 is involved with RAD51 in a backup pathway that repairs meiotic double-strand breaks without yielding crossovers when the major recombination pathway, which relies on DMC1, fails.

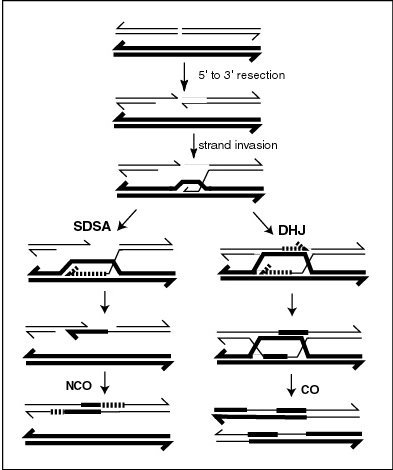
A current model of meiotic recombination, initiated by a double-strand break or gap, followed by pairing with an homologous chromosome and strand invasion to initiate the recombinational repair process. Repair of the gap can lead to crossover (CO) or non-crossover (NCO) of the flanking regions. CO recombination is thought to occur by the Double Holliday Junction (DHJ) model, illustrated on the right, above. NCO recombinants are thought to occur primarily by the Synthesis Dependent Strand Annealing (SDSA) model, illustrated on the left, above. Most recombination events appear to be the SDSA type.

MCM8 forms a complex with MCM9 that is required for DNA resection by the MRN complex (MRE11-RAD50-NBS1) at double strand breaks to generate single-stranded DNA ends. The formation of single-strand ends is an early step in homologous recombination (see Figure). MCM8/MCM9 interacts with MRN and is required for the nuclease action and stable association of MRN with double-strand breaks. The HROB protein is involved in recruiting the MCM8-MCM9 complex to sites of DNA damage.

In humans, an MCM8 mutation can give rise to premature ovarian failure, as well as chromosomal instability.

== See also ==
- Mini Chromosome Maintenance
