= EEF1G =

Protein-coding gene in the species Homo sapiens

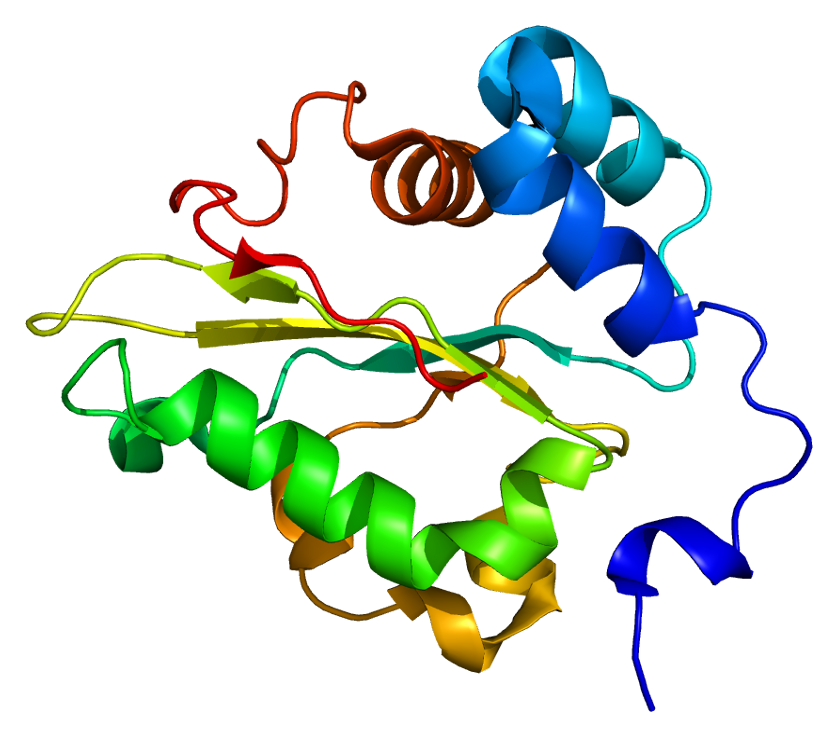
Available structures
PDB	Ortholog search: PDBe RCSB
PDB	List of PDB id codes 1PBU

Identifiers
- Aliases: EEF1G, EF1G, GIG35, eukaryotic translation elongation factor 1 gamma
- External IDs: OMIM: 130593; MGI: 1914410; HomoloGene: 20363; GeneCards: EEF1G; OMA:EEF1G - orthologs

Gene location (Human)
Chr.	Chromosome 11 (human)
Band	11q12.3	Start	62,559,596 bp
Band	11q12.3	End	62,574,086 bp

Gene location (Mouse)
Chr.	Chromosome 19 (mouse)
Band	19|19 A	Start	8,944,405 bp
Band	19|19 A	End	8,955,843 bp
RNA expression pattern
Bgee	Human / Mouse (ortholog); Top expressed in: ganglionic eminence; ventricular zone; gonad; gastrocnemius muscle; skeletal muscle tissue; stromal cell of endometrium; skin of leg; skin of abdomen; muscle of thigh; left ovary / Top expressed in: ventricular zone; yolk sac; blastocyst; lip; embryo; morula; esophagus; tail of embryo; dentate gyrus of hippocampal formation granule cell; embryo; More reference expression data
BioGPS	n/a
Gene ontology
Molecular function	protein binding; cadherin binding; translation elongation factor activity; glutathione transferase activity
Cellular component	cytoplasm; cytosol; extracellular exosome; membrane; endoplasmic reticulum; nucleus
Biological process	translational elongation; response to virus; protein biosynthesis; glutathione metabolic process
Sources:Amigo / QuickGO
Orthologs
Species	Human	Mouse
Entrez	1937	67160
Ensembl	ENSG00000254772	ENSMUSG00000071644
UniProt	P26641	Q9D8N0
RefSeq (mRNA)	NM_001404	NM_026007
RefSeq (protein)	NP_001395	NP_080283
Location (UCSC)	Chr 11: 62.56 – 62.57 Mb	Chr 19: 8.94 – 8.96 Mb
PubMed search
- Wikidata
View/Edit Human	View/Edit Mouse

Elongation factor 1-gamma is a protein that in humans is encoded by the EEF1G gene.

== Function ==
This gene encodes a subunit of the elongation factor-1 complex, which is responsible for the enzymatic delivery of aminoacyl tRNAs to the ribosome. This subunit contains an N-terminal glutathione transferase domain, which may be involved in regulating the assembly of multisubunit complexes containing this elongation factor and aminoacyl-tRNA synthetases.

== Interactions ==
EEF1G has been shown to interact with:

- EEF1B2,
- EEF1D,
- HARS,
- LZTS1,
- LARS, and
- RECQL5.
