= Leucine–tRNA ligase, cytoplasmic =

Enzyme found in humans

LARS1

Identifiers
- Aliases: LARS1, Leucyl-tRNA synthetase, ILFS1, HSPC192, LARS, leucyl-tRNA synthetase 1, LRS, LEUS, LFIS, PIG44, hr025Cl, LEURS, RNTLS
- External IDs: OMIM: 151350; MGI: 1913808; GeneCards: LARS1
Available structures
PDB	Ortholog search: PDBe RCSB
PDB	List of PDB id codes 2WFD
Enzyme activity
EC #	BRENDA	ExPASy	KEGG	MetaCyc
6.1.1.4	↗	↗	↗	↗

Gene location (Human)
Chr.	Chromosome 5 (human)
Band	5q32	Start	146,110,566 bp
Band	5q32	End	146,182,696 bp

Gene location (Mouse)
Chr.	Chromosome 18 (mouse)
Band	18|18 B3	Start	42,335,363 bp
Band	18|18 B3	End	42,395,259 bp
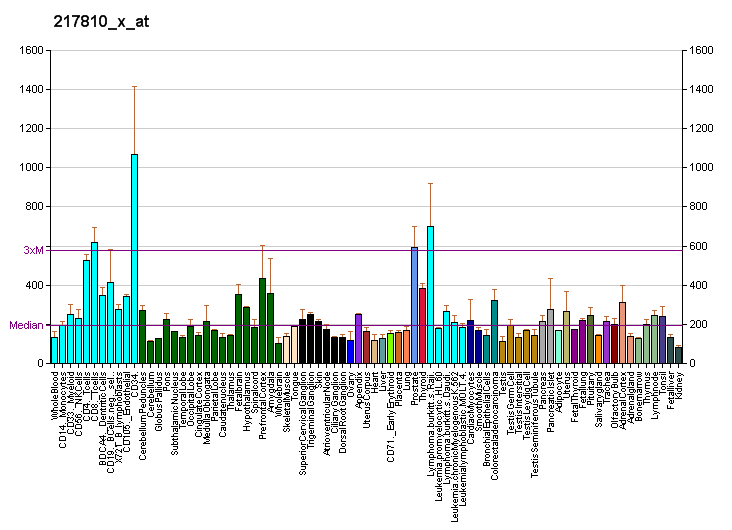
RNA expression pattern
Bgee	Human / Mouse (ortholog); Top expressed in: Brodmann area 23; endothelial cell; ventricular zone; middle temporal gyrus; body of pancreas; right uterine tube; ganglionic eminence; primary visual cortex; cartilage tissue; islet of Langerhans / Top expressed in: medullary collecting duct; basilar part of occipital bone; lacrimal gland; yolk sac; primitive streak; renal corpuscle; calvaria; seminal vesicula; ureter; salivary gland; More reference expression data
BioGPS	More reference expression data
Gene ontology
Molecular function	aminoacyl-tRNA ligase activity; nucleotide binding; leucine-tRNA ligase activity; ligase activity; protein binding; ATP binding; aminoacyl-tRNA editing activity; valine-tRNA ligase activity; GTPase activator activity; glutamine-tRNA ligase activity
Cellular component	cytosol; nuclear body; cytoplasm; lysosome; endoplasmic reticulum; endomembrane system; aminoacyl-tRNA synthetase multienzyme complex
Biological process	tRNA aminoacylation for protein translation; protein biosynthesis; leucyl-tRNA aminoacylation; valyl-tRNA aminoacylation; protein targeting to lysosome; regulation of cell size; negative regulation of autophagy; cellular response to amino acid starvation; positive regulation of GTPase activity; cellular response to amino acid stimulus; cellular response to leucine; positive regulation of TORC1 signaling; cellular response to leucine starvation; glutaminyl-tRNA aminoacylation; aminoacyl-tRNA metabolism involved in translational fidelity
Sources:Amigo / QuickGO
Orthologs
Databases	NCBI: entry; OMA: entry
Species	Human	Mouse
Entrez	51520	107045
Ensembl	ENSG00000133706	ENSMUSG00000024493
UniProt	Q9P2J5	Q8BMJ2
RefSeq (mRNA)	NM_020117; NM_001317964; NM_001317965; NM_016460	NM_134137
RefSeq (protein)	NP_001304893; NP_001304894; NP_057544; NP_064502	NP_598898
Location (UCSC)	Chr 5: 146.11 – 146.18 Mb	Chr 18: 42.34 – 42.4 Mb
PubMed search
- Wikidata
View/Edit Human	View/Edit Mouse

Leucine–tRNA ligase, cytoplasmic, also called leucyl-tRNA synthetase 1, is an enzyme that in humans is encoded by the LARS1 gene (previously LARS). Like the related enzyme, LARS2, this enzyme functions as a Leucine–tRNA ligase, which means it attaches the amino acid leucine to its corresponding transfer RNA (tRNA^{Leu}), which is needed for RNA-to-protein translation.

== Function ==
This gene encodes a cytosolic leucine-tRNA synthetase, a member of the class I aminoacyl-tRNA synthetase family. The encoded enzyme catalyzes the ATP-dependent ligation of L-leucine to tRNA(Leu). It is found in the cytoplasm as part of a multisynthetase complex and interacts with the arginyl-tRNA synthetase through its C-terminal domain. Alternatively spliced transcript variants of this gene have been found; however, their full-length nature is not known.

== Interactions ==
Leucyl-tRNA synthetase has been shown to interact with EEF1G.

== Inhibitors ==
- BC-LI-0186
- Tavaborole

== Medical significance ==
Pathogenic (homozygous) mutations in LARS1 are associated with symptoms including acute liver failure in the first year of life, and called infantile liver failure syndrome-1 (ILFS1).

== See also ==
- Leucine-tRNA ligase
