= PSMC3 interacting protein =

PSMC3IP

Identifiers
- Aliases: PSMC3IP, GT198, HOP2, HUMGT198A, ODG3, TBPIP, PSMC3 interacting protein
- External IDs: OMIM: 608665; MGI: 1098610; GeneCards: PSMC3IP
Available structures
PDB	Ortholog search: PDBe RCSB
PDB	List of PDB id codes 2MH2

Gene location (Human)
Chr.	Chromosome 17 (human)
Band	17q21.2	Start	42,572,310 bp
Band	17q21.2	End	42,577,831 bp

Gene location (Mouse)
Chr.	Chromosome 11 (mouse)
Band	11|11 D	Start	100,982,649 bp
Band	11|11 D	End	100,986,262 bp
RNA expression pattern
Bgee	Human / Mouse (ortholog); Top expressed in: tendon of biceps brachii; left testis; right testis; internal globus pallidus; sperm; ventricular zone; ganglionic eminence; gonad; buccal mucosa cell; testicle / Top expressed in: seminiferous tubule; condyle; fossa; genital tubercle; tail of embryo; Paneth cell; primary oocyte; Rostral migratory stream; primitive streak; medial ganglionic eminence; More reference expression data
BioGPS	n/a
Gene ontology
Molecular function	DNA binding; nuclear receptor coactivator activity
Cellular component	nucleus; nucleoplasm; cellular component
Biological process	DNA recombination; meiosis; reciprocal meiotic recombination; positive regulation of nucleic acid-templated transcription
Sources:Amigo / QuickGO
Orthologs
Databases	NCBI: entry; OMA: entry
Species	Human	Mouse
Entrez	29893	19183
Ensembl	ENSG00000131470	ENSMUSG00000019303
UniProt	Q9P2W1	O35047
RefSeq (mRNA)	NM_001256014; NM_001256015; NM_001256016; NM_013290; NM_016556	NM_008949
RefSeq (protein)	NP_001242943; NP_001242944; NP_001242945; NP_037422; NP_057640	NP_032975
Location (UCSC)	Chr 17: 42.57 – 42.58 Mb	Chr 11: 100.98 – 100.99 Mb
PubMed search
- Wikidata
View/Edit Human	View/Edit Mouse

PSMC3 interacting protein, also called homologous-pairing protein 2 homolog, is a protein which in humans is encoded by the gene PSMC3IP (aliases include GT198, TBPIP, and HOP2). The gene is located within the BRCA1 locus at chromosome 17q21. The PSMC3IP gene is often found mutated and overexpressed in certain human cancers including breast and ovarian cancers.

GT198 acts as a DNA repair factor responsible for error-free repair of DNA double-strand breaks. GT198 also controls gene regulation, including steroid hormone-mediated gene activation as a steroid hormone receptor coactivator.

Similar to BRCA1, GT198 is a breast and ovarian cancer susceptibility gene with germline mutations found in a small percentage of early-onset breast and ovarian cancer families.

== Gene ==
GT198 is located at the long arm of human chromosome 17 (17q21). GT198 spans 5.5 kilobase pairs (Kb) and contains eight exons. GT198 is located 470 Kb proximal to BRCA1 and 2.9 megabase pairs (Mb) distal to Her2/neu between the two cancer genes. It is currently unknown if genetic instability of each gene could affect neighboring cancer genes. GT198 is found to have mutation, amplification, recombination and distance translocation in germline DNA of one case of human breast cancer.

== Protein structure ==
GT198 is a small protein with its monomer contains 217 amino acids. It comprises a DNA-binding domain and forms a protein homodimer or heterodimer.

== Function and mechanism ==
GT198 protein binds to single-stranded and double-stranded DNA. Its DNA-binding function explains its multiple roles found in transcriptional activation, DNA repair, and meiosis where the strands of DNA helix are regulated. GT198 protein is likely associated with a nuclear protein complex that specializes functions in transcription and DNA repair. Consistent with other DNA repair factors, the defect of GT198 activity would be a risk in these fundamental cellular functions that leads to apoptosis and cancer.

=== Transcription ===
GT198 has been shown to be a nuclear receptor coactivator, regulating gene activation controlled by steroid hormone receptors. These include estrogen, progesterone, glucocorticoid, thyroid, and androgen receptors. GT198 also regulates VEGF and CYP17 gene promoters and several adipogenic or angiogenic factors. GT198 can both activate and suppress genes, in part because GT198 has truncated protein isoforms, called splice variants, to compete or counterbalance its wildtype activity.

=== DNA repair ===
The DNA repair functions of GT198 are mostly published under the name of Hop2 and TBPIP. GT198 has been extensively shown to regulate DNA repair, to stimulate Rad51-induced DNA strand exchange. GT198 may act similarly to DNA recombinase, an activity present in Rad51 homologs. GT198 forms heterodimer with MND1 and their complex stimulate DMC1 and RAD51-mediated DNA strand exchange. GT198 is also required for meiosis. Knockout GT198 mice, the genetically modified mice with the GT198 gene inactivated, showed sterile phenotype with defects in testis and ovary without able to reproduce.

=== Cancer-testis antigen ===
GT198 protein expression pattern is similar to the cancer-testis antigens. In human tumor tissues, however, GT198 overexpression is mostly found in tumor microenvironment, also called tumor stroma. Low level of GT198 is present in normal ovary, bone marrow, spleen, and thymus. In human breast cancer, GT198 is a marker for mutant tumor stroma where breast cancer develops. When mutated or activated, GT198 protein expresses in cell cytoplasm rather than nucleus, permitting cytoplasmic expression as a marker of altered GT198.

== Discovery ==
After the breast cancer susceptibility gene locus was identified at chromosome 17q21 by Dr. Mary-Claire King's laboratory in 1990, a number of research laboratories competed for screening the locus using various genetic approaches. Once BRCA1 was found in 1994, the continued screening ended while GT198 was published in 1995 as one of the partial cDNA clones resulted from the genetic screening. GT198 stands for "genomic transcript number 198." This name was later chosen in honor of the first discovery of the GT198 gene. The mouse, and human GT198 gene, were subsequently described.

== Isoforms ==
GT198 has protein isoforms as splice variants encoded by at least six alternative spliced transcripts. The splice variants (GT198a, GT198-1, GT198-2, GT198-3, GT198-4, GT198a-4) encode a truncated version of GT198 protein containing the DNA-binding domain at its C-terminal half. When mutations are present in cancer, isoforms are often overly produced causing abnormal or unregulated GT198 activity.

== Gene mutations in disease and cancer ==
=== Germline mutations ===
GT198 germline deletion and mutation have been linked to primary ovarian insufficiency, when female members were affected in families with XX-female gonadal dysgenesis. However, GT198 may not be a common cause of primary ovarian insufficiency.

In breast and ovarian cancer families, pathogenic germline mutations or variants in GT198 were identified at a low frequency (4-5%) in patients mostly with early cancer onset (age younger than 36). The causative effect of GT198 mutations in cancer was supported by segregating mutations in cancer families.

=== Somatic mutations ===
Deleterious somatic mutations, which often cluster in the 5´-UTR and at the exon 4/intron 4 border of GT198, are abundantly detected in breast and ovarian cancers and in fallopian tube tumors. Many somatic mutations were interpreted as splicing mutations since alternative splicing was affected. The frequency of GT198 somatic mutations in cancer is unusually high.

== Cancer detection biomarker ==
GT198 expression is specific to reactive or angiogenic tumor stromal cells which occur at the early stage of tumor. GT198 expression in tumor tissues can be a biomarker for early cancer detection. These include human solid tumors in breast, ovary, uterus, fallopian tube, prostate, bladder, testis, lung, brain, melanoma, kidney, oral cavity, thyroid, and colon.

== Therapeutic target ==
It has been shown that cancer chemotherapy drug paclitaxel directly inhibits GT198 protein with a high affinity, so that GT198 protein may be a new protein target of paclitaxel. Paclitaxel, sold under the brand name Taxol, is a clinical successful chemotherapy medication widely used to treat many types of solid tumors. In addition, GT198 peptide vaccine reduced tumor growth in mice suggesting that GT198 is a potential drug target in immunotherapy. This is due to GT198 expression in tumor angiogenesis that may give rise tumor cells.

A new study has found that GT198 is a direct target of many oncology drugs and several anticancer herbs. Over a hundred of clinical oncology drugs were tested, and a panel of well-known oncology drugs directly inhibit GT198 DNA-binding activity in vitro. These include mitoxantrone, doxorubicin, paclitaxel, docetaxel, etoposide, dactinomycin, carfilzomib, sirolimus (rapamycin), imatinib (Gleevec), sunitinib, trifluridine, and aminolevulinic acid. GT198 has protein sequence homology with DNA topoisomerase, so that DNA topoisomerase inhibitors are also GT198 inhibitors. Interestingly, several clinical successful anticancer herbs also inhibit GT198. These include a common spice called Allspice from Jamaica, a tree product Gleditsia sinensis L (ZaoJiaoCi in Chinese) from China, and an online health supplement BIRM (Biological Immune Response Modulator) from Ecuador. GT198 is a multi-drug target in human cancer therapy.
