= EEF1B2 =

Protein-coding gene in humans

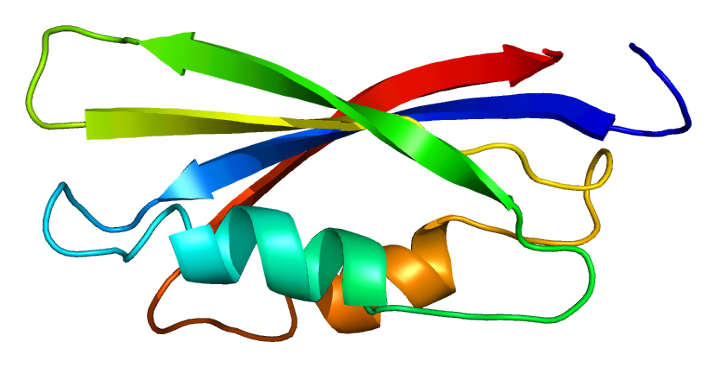

Identifiers
- Aliases: EEF1B2, EEF1B, EEF1B1, EF1B, eukaryotic translation elongation factor 1 beta 2
- External IDs: OMIM: 600655; MGI: 1929520; GeneCards: EEF1B2
Available structures
PDB	Ortholog search: PDBe RCSB
PDB	List of PDB id codes 1B64

Gene location (Human)
Chr.	Chromosome 2 (human)
Band	2q33.3	Start	206,159,585 bp
Band	2q33.3	End	206,162,928 bp

Gene location (Mouse)
Chr.	Chromosome 1 (mouse)
Band	1|1 C2	Start	63,215,984 bp
Band	1|1 C2	End	63,219,645 bp
RNA expression pattern
Bgee	Human / Mouse (ortholog); Top expressed in: body of pancreas; Achilles tendon; left ovary; lymph node; skin of abdomen; islet of Langerhans; right ovary; epithelium of colon; canal of the cervix; granulocyte / Top expressed in: epiblast; ovary; genital tubercle; thymus; ventricular zone; pancreas; uterus; spleen; bone marrow; placenta; More reference expression data
BioGPS	n/a
Gene ontology
Molecular function	protein binding; translation elongation factor activity; guanyl-nucleotide exchange factor activity
Cellular component	cytoplasm; cytosol; endoplasmic reticulum; nucleus; eukaryotic translation elongation factor 1 complex
Biological process	translational elongation; protein biosynthesis; response to ethanol
Sources:Amigo / QuickGO
Orthologs
Databases	NCBI: entry; OMA: entry
Species	Human	Mouse
Entrez	1933	55949
Ensembl	ENSG00000114942; ENSG00000283391	ENSMUSG00000025967
UniProt	P24534	O70251
RefSeq (mRNA)	NM_021121; NM_001037663; NM_001959	NM_018796
RefSeq (protein)	NP_001032752; NP_001950; NP_066944	NP_061266
Location (UCSC)	Chr 2: 206.16 – 206.16 Mb	Chr 1: 63.22 – 63.22 Mb
PubMed search
- Wikidata
View/Edit Human	View/Edit Mouse

Elongation factor 1-beta is a protein that in humans is encoded by the EEF1B2 gene.

== Function ==
This gene encodes a translation elongation factor. The protein is a guanine nucleotide exchange factor involved in the transfer of aminoacylated tRNAs to the ribosome. Alternative splicing results in three transcript variants which differ only in the 5' UTR.

== Interactions ==
EEF1B2 has been shown to interact with EEF1G and HARS.
