= MCM9 =

Enzyme found in humans

Identifiers
- Aliases: MCM9, C6orf61, MCMDC1, dJ329L24.1, dJ329L24.3, ODG4, minichromosome maintenance 9 homologous recombination repair factor
- External IDs: OMIM: 610098; MGI: 1918817; GeneCards: MCM9
Enzyme activity
EC #	BRENDA	ExPASy	KEGG	MetaCyc
5.6.2.4	↗	↗	↗	↗

Gene location (Human)
Chr.	Chromosome 6 (human)
Band	6q22.31	Start	118,813,442 bp
Band	6q22.31	End	118,935,162 bp

Gene location (Mouse)
Chr.	Chromosome 10 (mouse)
Band	10|10 B3	Start	53,412,411 bp
Band	10|10 B3	End	53,506,535 bp
RNA expression pattern
Bgee	Human / Mouse (ortholog); Top expressed in: secondary oocyte; bronchial epithelial cell; testicle; monocyte; gonad; Achilles tendon; palpebral conjunctiva; sural nerve; ventricular zone; right uterine tube / Top expressed in: zygote; secondary oocyte; cumulus cell; ureter; genital tubercle; primary oocyte; tail of embryo; ventricular zone; embryo; thymus; More reference expression data
BioGPS	n/a
Gene ontology
Molecular function	DNA binding; nucleotide binding; hydrolase activity; ATP binding; helicase activity; DNA helicase activity; chromatin binding; protein binding; enzyme binding; MutLbeta complex binding; MutSalpha complex binding; MutSbeta complex binding; protein-containing complex binding; DNA replication origin binding; single-stranded DNA binding
Cellular component	nucleus; MCM8-MCM9 complex; chromosome; MCM complex
Biological process	gamete generation; female gamete generation; DNA repair; cellular response to DNA damage stimulus; double-strand break repair via homologous recombination; DNA replication initiation; DNA replication; DNA duplex unwinding; recombinational interstrand cross-link repair; mismatch repair involved in maintenance of fidelity involved in DNA-dependent DNA replication; protein localization to chromatin
Sources:Amigo / QuickGO
Orthologs
Databases	NCBI: entry; OMA: entry
Species	Human	Mouse
Entrez	254394	71567
Ensembl	ENSG00000111877	ENSMUSG00000058298
UniProt	Q9NXL9	Q2KHI9
RefSeq (mRNA)	NM_153255; NM_017696	NM_027830
RefSeq (protein)	NP_060166; NP_694987; NP_001365285; NP_001365286; NP_001365287 NP_001365288; NP_001365289; NP_001365290; NP_001365291; NP_001365292; NP_001365293; NP_001365294; NP_001365295; NP_001365296; NP_001365297; NP_001365298; NP_001365299; NP_001365300; NP_001365301	NP_082106
Location (UCSC)	Chr 6: 118.81 – 118.94 Mb	Chr 10: 53.41 – 53.51 Mb
PubMed search
- Wikidata
View/Edit Human	View/Edit Mouse

DNA helicase MCM9 is an enzyme that in humans is encoded by the MCM9 gene. Copies of MCM8 and this protein combine together to form a heterohexamer (6-component) complex, which functions as a helicase and participates in DNA repair.

== Medical Significance ==
Pathogenic mutations in MCM9 are associated with incomplete development of female secondary sexual characteristics, amenorrhea (not having periods), and ovaries which were either small or not visible on ultrasounds. This condition appears to be inherited in an autosomal recessive way, and has been denoted ovarian dysgenesis 4 (ODG4).
