= Coiled-coil domain containing protein 120 =

Protein-coding gene in humans

CCDC120

Identifiers
- Aliases: CCDC120, JM11, Coiled-coil domain containing protein 120, coiled-coil domain containing 120
- External IDs: OMIM: 300947; MGI: 1859619; HomoloGene: 14146; GeneCards: CCDC120; OMA:CCDC120 - orthologs

Gene location (Human)
Chr.	X chromosome (human)
Band	Xp11.23	Start	49,053,572 bp
Band	Xp11.23	End	49,069,857 bp

Gene location (Mouse)
Chr.	X chromosome (mouse)
Band	X A1.1|X 3.48 cM	Start	7,597,953 bp
Band	X A1.1|X 3.48 cM	End	7,617,144 bp
RNA expression pattern
Bgee	Human / Mouse (ortholog); Top expressed in: skin of leg; skin of abdomen; olfactory zone of nasal mucosa; buccal mucosa cell; right hemisphere of cerebellum; minor salivary glands; gonad; anterior pituitary; vagina; ectocervix / Top expressed in: lip; otic vesicle; saccule; zygote; neural tube; intestinal villus; otic placode; cerebellar cortex; yolk sac; esophagus; More reference expression data
BioGPS	n/a
Gene ontology
Molecular function	protein binding
Cellular component	cytoplasm; growth cone; endosome; cell projection; centriole; cytoskeleton; centriolar subdistal appendage
Biological process	multicellular organism development; protein localization; microtubule anchoring at centrosome
Sources:Amigo / QuickGO
Orthologs
Species	Human	Mouse
Entrez	90060	54648
Ensembl	ENSG00000147144	ENSMUSG00000031150
UniProt	Q96HB5	A2AEV7
RefSeq (mRNA)	NM_033626; NM_001163321; NM_001163322; NM_001163323; NM_001271835 NM_001271836	NM_207202
RefSeq (protein)	NP_001156793; NP_001156794; NP_001156795; NP_001258764; NP_001258765 NP_296375	NP_997085
Location (UCSC)	Chr X: 49.05 – 49.07 Mb	Chr X: 7.6 – 7.62 Mb
PubMed search
- Wikidata
View/Edit Human	View/Edit Mouse

Coiled coil domain containing protein 120 (CCDC120), also known as JM11 protein, is a protein that, in humans, is encoded by the CCDC120 gene. The function of CCDC120 has not been formally identified but structural components, conservation, and interactions can be identified computationally.

== Gene ==
The CCDC120 gene is located on human chromosome X, at Xp11.23. There are six different transcript variants of CCDC120 produced by alternative splicing.

=== Patterns ===
The mRNA transcript of CCDC120 contains a 120bp repeat near the 3' end.

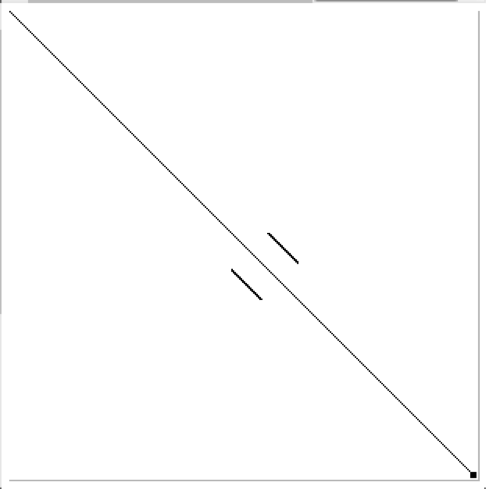
120bp repeat is visible on the graph.

== Homology ==
=== Paralogs ===
CCDC120 has 3 identifiable paralogs in humans, FERM Domain Containing 4A, FERM domain Containing 4B, and C1orf106.

=== Orthologs ===
The orthologous space of CCDC120 can be traced back as far as fish such as Danio rerio, Oryzias latipes, and Dicentrarchus labrax.

== Protein ==
The CCDC120 protein has four different isoforms, ranging from 618 to 696 amino acids in length. Isoform 1 is the longest isoform and is encoded by transcript 1 of the CCDC120 gene.

=== Interactions ===
Usher Syndrome 1C Binding Protein 1, CYTH2, MDFI, Centrosomal Protein 170kDa Pseudogene 1, and Keratin 15 have all been shown experimentally to interact with CCDC120 Other interactions have been identified by coexpression and datamining and can be seen in the figure.

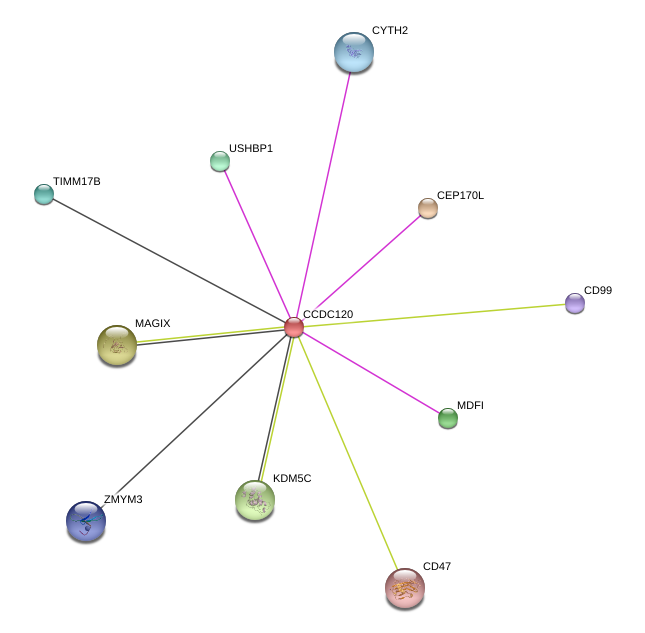
Shows the protein interactions for CCDC120 with experimental evidence indicated by a pink line, coexpression by dark green lines, and textmining by light green lines. This image was generated using the STRING 9.05 application. (http://string-db.org/)

=== Post-translational modification ===
Algorithms suggest a number of sites of Serine phosphorylation as well as a few sites of Threonine and Tyrosine phosphorylation. Many of these sites are conserved in Gorilla gorilla gorilla, Mus musculus, and Danio rerio. There is one potential N-Glycosylation site identified.

=== Structure ===
The protein structure of CCDC120 is predicted to contain, as the name implies, a 65 amino acid coiled coil from positions 109–173. Multiple algorithms identify 3 distinct sites where alpha-helical structures could form which are conserved in Gorilla gorilla gorilla and Danio rerio. Algorithms do not agree on any location for a beta sheet structure.

== Expression ==
=== Promoter ===
Algorithms suggest that CCDC120 has a promoter of 601bp, this promoter contains a number of possible transcription factor sites as shown in the figure.

The nucleotide sequence of the 601 bp promoter for CCDC120 is shown with key transcription factors that are well-identified by algorithms labeled. (http://www.genomatix.de/)

== References in Scientific Literature ==
CCDC120 was found to be upregulated under pulsed electromagnetic fields in human osteoblast-like cells. CCDC120 has a 7 base deletion in a Metastatic Olfactory Neuroblastoma. CCDC120 is downregulated after neonatal hypoxic-ischemic brain injury in rats.
