= HINT1 =

Protein-coding gene in humans

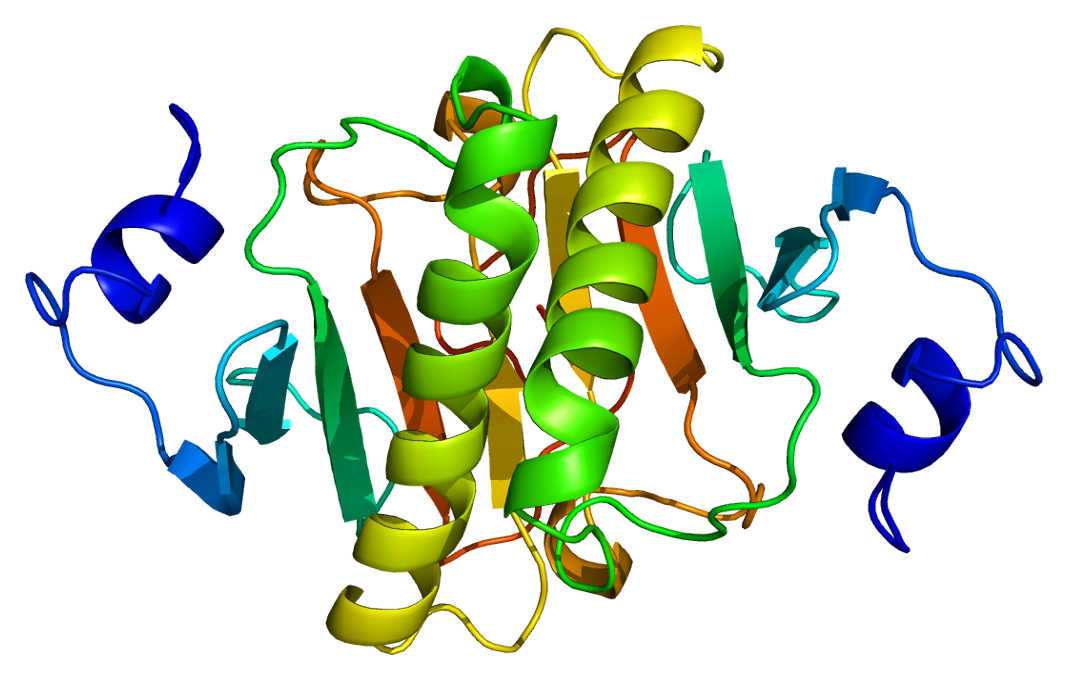

Identifiers
- Aliases: HINT1, HINT, NMAN, PKCI-1, PRKCNH1, histidine triad nucleotide binding protein 1
- External IDs: OMIM: 601314; MGI: 1321133; GeneCards: HINT1
Available structures
PDB	Ortholog search: PDBe RCSB
PDB	List of PDB id codes 1AV5, 1KPA, 1KPB, 1KPC, 1KPE, 1KPF, 3TW2, 4EQE, 4EQG, 4EQH, 4ZKL, 4ZKV, 5I2E, 5I2F

Gene location (Human)
Chr.	Chromosome 5 (human)
Band	5q23.3	Start	131,155,383 bp
Band	5q23.3	End	131,224,468 bp

Gene location (Mouse)
Chr.	Chromosome 11 (mouse)
Band	11|11 B1.3	Start	54,757,209 bp
Band	11|11 B1.3	End	54,761,327 bp
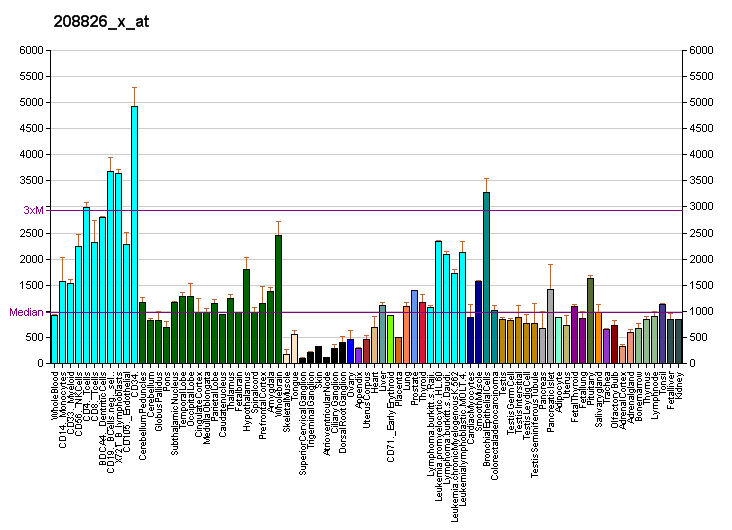

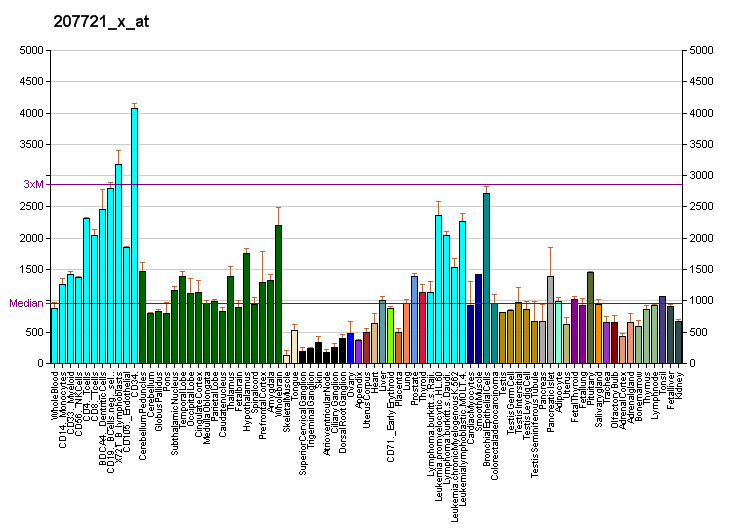

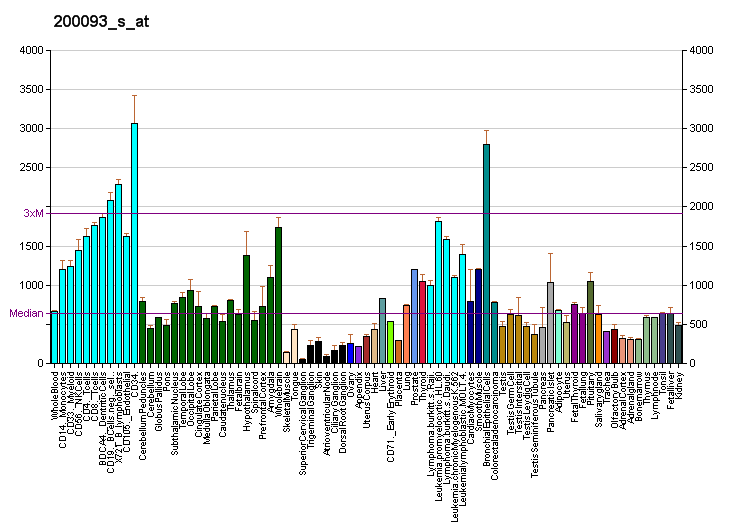
RNA expression pattern
Bgee	Human / Mouse (ortholog); Top expressed in: endothelial cell; oocyte; middle temporal gyrus; Brodmann area 23; pons; epithelium of nasopharynx; gingival epithelium; renal medulla; seminal vesicula; spinal ganglia / Top expressed in: fossa; renal corpuscle; Paneth cell; condyle; endothelial cell of lymphatic vessel; medullary collecting duct; facial motor nucleus; barrel cortex; Epithelium of choroid plexus; vas deferens; More reference expression data
BioGPS	More reference expression data
Gene ontology
Molecular function	nucleotide binding; catalytic activity; hydrolase activity; protein kinase C binding
Cellular component	histone deacetylase complex; plasma membrane; extracellular exosome; cytoskeleton; nucleus; cytoplasm; cytosol
Biological process	purine ribonucleotide catabolic process; positive regulation of calcium-mediated signaling; regulation of transcription, DNA-templated; transcription, DNA-templated; intrinsic apoptotic signaling pathway by p53 class mediator; signal transduction; apoptotic process
Sources:Amigo / QuickGO
Orthologs
Databases	NCBI: entry; OMA: entry
Species	Human	Mouse
Entrez	3094	15254
Ensembl	ENSG00000169567	ENSMUSG00000020267
UniProt	P49773	P70349
RefSeq (mRNA)	NM_005340	NM_008248
RefSeq (protein)	NP_005331	NP_032274
Location (UCSC)	Chr 5: 131.16 – 131.22 Mb	Chr 11: 54.76 – 54.76 Mb
PubMed search
- Wikidata
View/Edit Human	View/Edit Mouse

Histidine triad nucleotide-binding protein 1 also known as adenosine 5'-monophosphoramidase is an enzyme that in humans is encoded by the HINT1 gene.

HINT1 hydrolyzes purine nucleotide phosphoramidates with a single phosphate group. In addition, functions as scaffolding protein that modulates transcriptional activation.

It is a haploinsufficient tumor suppressor gene that inhibits the Wnt/β-catenin pathway in colon cancer cells and microphthalmia-associated transcription factor (MITF) activity in human mast cells. In the LysRS-Ap4A-MITF signaling pathway, HINT1 inhibits the MITF transcriptional activity by direct association. Upon pathway activation, HINT1 is released from MITF by diadenosine tetraphosphate (Ap4A), produced by LysRS.

== See also ==
- Histidine triad nucleotide-binding protein 2 (HINT2)
