= HINT2 =

Protein-coding gene in the species Homo sapiens

Identifiers
- Aliases: HINT2, HIT-17, histidine triad nucleotide binding protein 2
- External IDs: OMIM: 609997; MGI: 1916167; GeneCards: HINT2
Available structures
PDB	Ortholog search: PDBe RCSB
PDB	List of PDB id codes 4INC, 4INI, 4NJX, 4NJY, 4NJZ, 4NK0

Gene location (Human)
Chr.	Chromosome 9 (human)
Band	9p13.3	Start	35,812,960 bp
Band	9p13.3	End	35,815,354 bp

Gene location (Mouse)
Chr.	Chromosome 4 (mouse)
Band	4|4 A5	Start	43,654,227 bp
Band	4|4 A5	End	43,656,466 bp
RNA expression pattern
Bgee	Human / Mouse (ortholog); Top expressed in: apex of heart; right lobe of liver; right adrenal gland; right adrenal cortex; left adrenal cortex; human kidney; muscle of thigh; left ventricle; mucosa of transverse colon; olfactory zone of nasal mucosa / Top expressed in: right kidney; choroid plexus of fourth ventricle; left lobe of liver; Ileal epithelium; human kidney; proximal tubule; interventricular septum; right ventricle; myocardium of ventricle; yolk sac; More reference expression data
BioGPS	n/a
Gene ontology
Molecular function	nucleotide binding; catalytic activity; hydrolase activity
Cellular component	nucleolus; mitochondrion
Biological process	steroid biosynthetic process; lipid metabolism; apoptotic process; negative regulation of peptidyl-lysine acetylation; lipid catabolic process
Sources:Amigo / QuickGO
Orthologs
Databases	NCBI: entry; OMA: entry
Species	Human	Mouse
Entrez	84681	68917
Ensembl	ENSG00000137133	ENSMUSG00000028470
UniProt	Q9BX68	Q9D0S9
RefSeq (mRNA)	NM_032593	NM_026871
RefSeq (protein)	NP_115982	NP_081147
Location (UCSC)	Chr 9: 35.81 – 35.82 Mb	Chr 4: 43.65 – 43.66 Mb
PubMed search
- Wikidata
View/Edit Human	View/Edit Mouse

Histidine triad nucleotide binding protein 2 (HINT2) is a mitochondrial protein that in humans is encoded by the HINT2 gene on chromosome 9. This protein is an AMP-lysine hydrolase and phosphoamidase and may contribute to tumor suppression.

== Structure ==
As a member of the histidine triad nucleotide-binding (Hint) protein family, which is a subfamily of the histidine triad (HIT) family, HINT2 contains a conserved histidine and HIT sequence motif (His-X-His-X-His-X-X), and the latter two histidines contribute to a catalytic triad. The 163-amino acid protein encoded by this gene forms a 17-kDa homodimer. Compared to other members of the Hint family, HINT2 has a 61% sequence homology to HINT1 and 28% sequence homology to HINT3. When compared with HINT1, the 35–amino acid extension at the HINT2 N-terminal corresponds to a predicted mitochondria import signal.

== Function ==
HINT2 is a member of the HIT superfamily and Hint subfamily, which are characterized as nucleotide hydrolases and transferases that act on the alpha-phosphate of ribonucleotides. The Hint family is the oldest within the HIT superfamily and thus, its members are highly conserved among eukaryotes and archaebacteria. The Hint proteins function as AMP-lysine hydrolases and phosphoramidases. In mammals, HINT2 is expressed in the liver, adrenal cortex, and pancreas and localizes to the mitochondria within their cells. Specifically, the protein is located in the inner mitochondrial membrane, facing the mitochondrial matrix. This positioning likely facilitates the transport of cholesterol from the cytosol to the matrix, which is necessary for steroidogenesis, by providing a contact site for the hydrophobic molecule and allowing it to cross the mitochondrial intermembrane space. HINT2 regulates steroidogenesis through calcium-dependent and calcium-independent signalling pathways that may serve to maintain a favorable mitochondrial potential. Its role in calcium homeostasis may also contribute to its proapoptotic function in hepatocytes and other non-steroidogenic cells, though the exact mechanism remains unclear.

== Clinical significance ==
Hint2, one of the three members of the Hint family of proteins, is localized to mitochondria of various cell types. In human adrenocarcinoma cells, Hint2 modulates Ca2+ handling by mitochondria. In all living organisms, intracellular calcium controls a wide variety of physiological processes. Extracellular stimuli generate temporally organized Ca2+ signals, which most of the time occur as repetitive spikes. The frequency of these oscillations controls the nature and the extent of the cellular response. Ca2+ oscillations originate from the repetitive opening of the inositol 1,4,5-trisphosphate (InsP3) receptors that are Ca2+ channels embedded in the membrane of the endoplasmic reticulum (ER). Opening of these channels is initiated by the stimulus-induced rise in InsP3; because their activity is biphasically regulated by the level of cytoplasmic Ca2+, oscillations can occur. Mitochondria also affect cytoplasmic Ca2+ signals. They can both buffer cytosolic Ca2+ changes (7 and 8) and release Ca2+. At rest, intramitochondrial ([Ca2+]m) and cytosolic Ca2+ concentration ([Ca2+]i) are similar, of the order of 100 nM (9).

The Hint family has been implicated in tumor suppression. Int2, a member of the superfamily of histidine triad proteins, has been localized exclusively in mitochondria, near the contact sites of the inner membrane. This enzyme is highly expressed in the liver, where it has been shown to stimulate mitochondrial lipid metabolism, respiration, and glucose homeostasis. Hint2 modulates cytoplasmic and mitochondrial Ca2+ dynamics by stimulating the activity of the mitochondrial respiratory chain. It appears that the absence of Hint2 leads to a premature opening of the mitochondrial permeability transition pore (mPTP) in mitochondrial suspensions. As such, HINT2 plays a prominent role in mitochondrial cell death signaling (e.g. apoptosis) and in ischemia-reperfusion injury (for instance during heart attacks) through calcium homeostasis.

In particular, HINT2 is also observed to be upregulated in breast, pancreatic, and colon cancer cells, while it is downregulated in hepatocellular carcinoma and endometrial cancer. Its exact role in tumor suppression remains unknown, though studies suggest it may promote apoptosis in hepatocellular carcinoma and endometrial cancer. In double knockout Hint2 mice, higher acylation and morphological alterations were observed in the mitochondria, suggesting that Hint2 may regulate glucose and lipid metabolism.

== Interactions ==
Currently, HINT2 has no known protein-protein interaction partners.

== See also ==
- Histidine triad nucleotide-binding protein 1 (HINT1)
