= Microphthalmia-associated transcription factor =

Mammalian protein found in humans

MITF
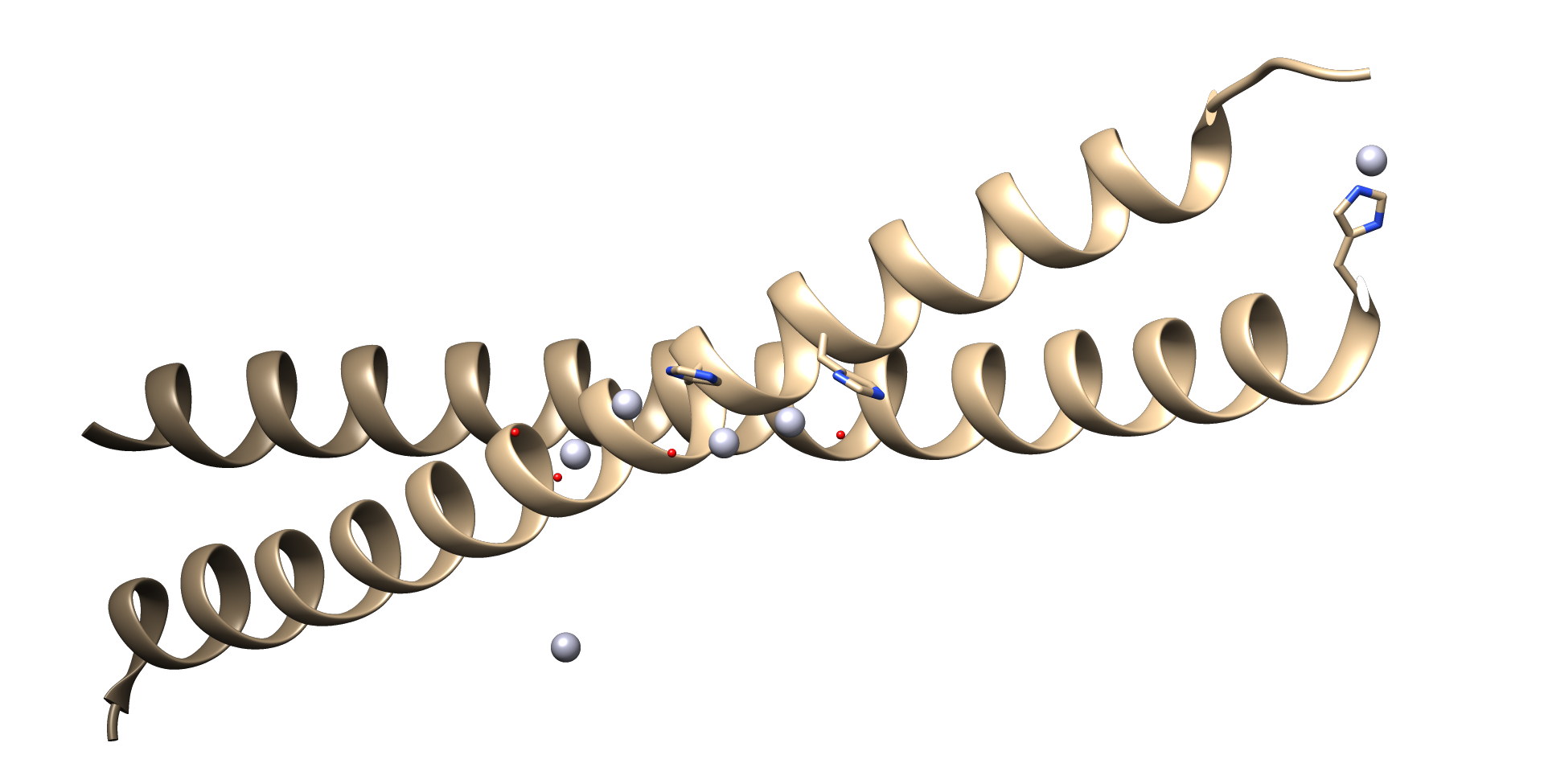

Identifiers
- Aliases: MITF, CMM8, MI, WS2, WS2A, bHLHe32, microphthalmia-associated transcription factor, melanogenesis associated transcription factor, COMMAD, melanocyte inducing transcription factor, MITF-A
- External IDs: OMIM: 156845; MGI: 104554; GeneCards: MITF
Available structures
PDB	Ortholog search: PDBe RCSB
PDB	List of PDB id codes 4C7N

Gene location (Human)
Chr.	Chromosome 3 (human)
Band	3p13	Start	69,739,456 bp
Band	3p13	End	69,968,336 bp

Gene location (Mouse)
Chr.	Chromosome 6 (mouse)
Band	6 D3|6 45.05 cM	Start	97,784,013 bp
Band	6 D3|6 45.05 cM	End	97,998,310 bp
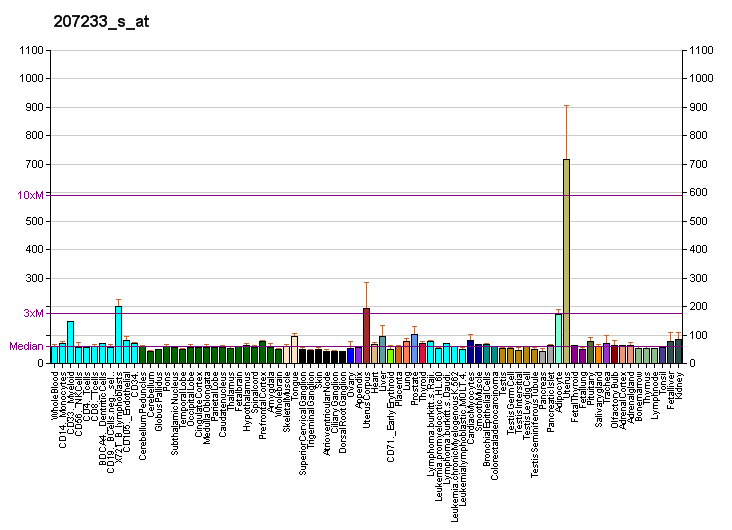
RNA expression pattern
Bgee	Human / Mouse (ortholog); Top expressed in: retinal pigment epithelium; Skeletal muscle tissue of biceps brachii; right ventricle; glutes; myocardium; Skeletal muscle tissue of rectus abdominis; vastus lateralis muscle; myocardium of left ventricle; deltoid muscle; urethra / Top expressed in: pineal gland; gastrula; decidua; iris; ciliary body; Epithelium of choroid plexus; retinal pigment epithelium; stria vascularis; right ventricle; atrioventricular valve; More reference expression data
BioGPS	More reference expression data
Gene ontology
Molecular function	DNA binding; protein dimerization activity; DNA-binding transcription factor activity; protein binding; DNA-binding transcription repressor activity, RNA polymerase II-specific; RNA polymerase II cis-regulatory region sequence-specific DNA binding; DNA-binding transcription activator activity, RNA polymerase II-specific; chromatin binding; transcription factor activity, RNA polymerase II distal enhancer sequence-specific binding; E-box binding; DNA-binding transcription factor activity, RNA polymerase II-specific
Cellular component	nucleoplasm; nucleus; protein-containing complex
Biological process	regulation of RNA biosynthetic process; regulation of transcription by RNA polymerase II; negative regulation of transcription by RNA polymerase II; positive regulation of DNA-templated transcription, initiation; transcription, DNA-templated; multicellular organism development; positive regulation of gene expression; transcription by RNA polymerase II; regulation of transcription, DNA-templated; regulation of gene expression; Wnt signaling pathway; cell differentiation; osteoclast differentiation; melanocyte differentiation; regulation of cell population proliferation; camera-type eye development; negative regulation of apoptotic process; pigmentation; canonical Wnt signaling pathway involved in negative regulation of apoptotic process; cell fate commitment; regulation of osteoclast differentiation; positive regulation of transcription, DNA-templated; positive regulation of transcription by RNA polymerase II; bone remodeling; protein-containing complex assembly; negative regulation of cell migration
Sources:Amigo / QuickGO
Orthologs
Databases	NCBI: entry; OMA: entry
Species	Human	Mouse
Entrez	4286	17342
Ensembl	ENSG00000187098	ENSMUSG00000035158
UniProt	O75030	Q08874
RefSeq (mRNA)	NM_000248; NM_001184967; NM_001184968; NM_006722; NM_198158 NM_198159; NM_198177; NM_198178; NM_001354604; NM_001354605; NM_001354606; NM_001354607; NM_001354608	NM_001113198; NM_001178049; NM_008601
RefSeq (protein)	NP_000239; NP_001171896; NP_001171897; NP_006713; NP_937801 NP_937802; NP_937820; NP_937821; NP_001341533; NP_001341534; NP_001341535; NP_001341536; NP_001341537	NP_001106669; NP_001171520; NP_032627
Location (UCSC)	Chr 3: 69.74 – 69.97 Mb	Chr 6: 97.78 – 98 Mb
PubMed search
- Wikidata
View/Edit Human	View/Edit Mouse

Microphthalmia-associated transcription factor also known as class E basic helix-loop-helix protein 32 or bHLHe32 is a protein that in humans is encoded by the MITF gene.

MITF is a basic helix-loop-helix leucine zipper transcription factor involved in lineage-specific pathway regulation of many types of cells including melanocytes, osteoclasts, and mast cells. The term "lineage-specific", since it relates to MITF, means genes or traits that are only found in a certain cell type. Therefore, MITF may be involved in the rewiring of signaling cascades that are specifically required for the survival and physiological function of their normal cell precursors.

MITF, together with transcription factor EB (TFEB), TFE3 and TFEC, belong to a subfamily of related bHLHZip proteins, termed the MiT-TFE family of transcription factors. The factors are able to form stable DNA-binding homo- and heterodimers. The gene that encodes for MITF resides at the mi locus in mice, and its protumorogenic targets include factors involved in cell death, DNA replication, repair, mitosis, microRNA production, membrane trafficking, mitochondrial metabolism, and much more. Mutation of this gene results in deafness, bone loss, small eyes, and poorly pigmented eyes and skin. In human subjects, because it is known that MITF controls the expression of various genes that are essential for normal melanin synthesis in melanocytes, mutations of MITF can lead to diseases such as melanoma, Waardenburg syndrome, and Tietz syndrome. Its function is conserved across vertebrates, including in fishes such as zebrafish and Xiphophorus.

An understanding of MITF is necessary to understand how certain lineage-specific cancers and other diseases progress. In addition, current and future research can lead to potential avenues to target this transcription factor mechanism for cancer prevention.

== Clinical significance ==
=== Mutations ===
As mentioned above, changes in MITF can result in serious health conditions. For example, mutations of MITF have been implicated in both Waardenburg syndrome and Tietz syndrome.

Waardenburg syndrome is a rare genetic disorder. Its symptoms include deafness, minor defects, and abnormalities in pigmentation. Mutations in the MITF gene have been found in certain patients with Waardenburg syndrome, type II. Mutations that change the amino acid sequence of that result in an abnormally small MITF are found. These mutations disrupt dimer formation, and as a result cause insufficient development of melanocytes. The shortage of melanocytes causes some of the characteristic features of Waardenburg syndrome.

Tietz syndrome, first described in 1923, is a congenital disorder often characterized by deafness and leucism. Tietz is caused by a mutation in the MITF gene. The mutation in MITF deletes or changes a single amino acid base pair specifically in the base motif region of the MITF protein. The new MITF protein is unable to bind to DNA and melanocyte development and subsequently melanin production is altered. A reduced number of melanocytes can lead to hearing loss, and decreased melanin production can account for the light skin and hair color that make Tietz syndrome so noticeable.

=== Melanoma ===
Melanocytes are commonly known as cells that are responsible for producing the pigment melanin which gives coloration to the hair, skin, and nails. The exact mechanisms of how melanocytes become cancerous are relatively unclear, but there is ongoing research to gain more information about the process. For example, it has been uncovered that the DNA of certain genes is often damaged in melanoma cells, most likely as a result of damage from UV radiation, and in turn increases the likelihood of developing melanoma. Specifically, it has been found that a large percentage of melanomas have mutations in the B-RAF gene which leads to melanoma by causing an MEK-ERK kinase cascade when activated. In addition to B-RAF, MITF is also known to play a crucial role in melanoma progression. Since it is a transcription factor that is involved in the regulation of genes related to invasiveness, migration, and metastasis, it can play a role in the progression of melanoma.

== Target genes ==
MITF recognizes E-box (CAYRTG) and M-box (TCAYRTG or CAYRTGA) sequences in the promoter regions of target genes. Known target genes (confirmed by at least two independent sources) of this transcription factor include,

ACP5	BCL2	BEST1	BIRC7
CDK2	CLCN7	DCT	EDNRB
GPNMB	GPR143	MC1R	MLANA
OSTM1	RAB27A	SILV	SLC45A2
TBX2	TRPM1	TYR	TYRP1

Additional genes identified by a microarray study (which confirmed the above targets) include the following,

MBP	TNFRSF14	IRF4	RBM35A
PLA1A	APOLD1	KCNN2	INPP4B
CAPN3	LGALS3	GREB1	FRMD4B
SLC1A4	TBC1D16	GMPR	ASAH1
MICAL1	TMC6	ITPKB	SLC7A8

== The LysRS-Ap_{4}A-MITF signaling pathway ==
The LysRS-Ap_{4}A-MITF signaling pathway was first discovered in mast cells, in which, the A mitogen-activated protein kinase (MAPK) pathway is activated upon allergen stimulation. The binding of immunoglobulin E to the high-affinity IgE receptor (FcεRI) provides the stimulus that starts the cascade.

Lysyl-tRNA synthetase (LysRS) normally resides in the multisynthetase complex. This complex consists of nine different aminoacyl-tRNA synthetases and three scaffold proteins and has been termed the "signalosome" due to its non-catalytic signalling functions. After activation, LysRS is phosphorylated on Serine 207 in a MAPK-dependent manner. This phosphorylation causes LysRS to change its conformation, detach from the complex and translocate into the nucleus, where it associates with the encoding histidine triad nucleotide–binding protein 1 (HINT1) thus forming the MITF-HINT1 inhibitory complex. The conformational change also switches LysRS activity from aminoacylation of Lysine tRNA to diadenosine tetraphosphate (Ap4A) production. Ap4A, which is an adenosine joined to another adenosine through a 5'-5'tetraphosphate bridge, binds to HINT1 and this releases MITF from the inhibitory complex, allowing it to transcribe its target genes. Specifically, Ap4A causes a polymerization of the HINT1 molecule into filaments. The polymerization blocks the interface for MITF and thus prevents the binding of the two proteins. This mechanism is dependent on the precise length of the phosphate bridge in the Ap4A molecule so other nucleotides such as ATP or AMP will not affect it.

MITF is also an integral part of melanocytes, where it regulates the expression of a number of proteins with melanogenic potential. Continuous expression of MITF at a certain level is one of the necessary factors for melanoma cells to proliferate, survive and avoid detection by host immune cells through the T-cell recognition of the melanoma-associated antigen (melan-A). Post-translational modifications of the HINT1 molecules have been shown to affect MITF gene expression as well as the binding of Ap4A. Mutations in HINT1 itself have been shown to be the cause of axonal neuropathies. The regulatory mechanism relies on the enzyme diadenosine tetraphosphate hydrolase, a member of the Nudix type 2 enzymatic family (NUDT2), to cleave Ap4A, allow the binding of HINT1 to MITF and thus suppress the expression of the MITF transcribed genes. NUDT2 itself has also been shown to be associated with human breast carcinoma, where it promotes cellular proliferation. The enzyme is 17 kDa large and can freely diffuse between the nucleus and cytosol explaining its presence in the nucleus. It has also been shown to be actively transported into the nucleus by directly interacting with the N-terminal domain of importin-β upon immunological stimulation of the mast cells. Growing evidence is pointing to the fact that the LysRS-Ap4A-MITF signalling pathway is in fact an integral aspect of controlling MITF transcriptional activity.

Activation of the LysRS-Ap4A-MITF signalling pathway by isoproterenol has been confirmed in cardiomyocytes. A heart specific isoform of MITF is a major regulator of cardiac growth and hypertrophy responsible for heart growth and for the physiological response of the cardiomyocytes to beta-adrenergic stimulation.

== Phosphorylation ==
MITF is phosphorylated on several serine and tyrosine residues. Serine phosphorylation is regulated by several signaling pathways including MAPK/BRAF/ERK, receptor tyrosine kinase KIT, GSK-3 and mTOR. In addition, several kinases including PI3K, AKT, SRC and P38 are also critical activators of MITF phosphorylation. In contrast, tyrosine phosphorylation is induced by the presence of the KIT oncogenic mutation D816V. This KIT^{D816V} pathway is dependent on SRC protein family activation signaling. The induction of serine phosphorylation by the frequently altered MAPK/BRAF pathway and the GSK-3 pathway in melanoma regulates MITF nuclear export and thereby decreasing MITF activity in the nucleus. Similarly, tyrosine phosphorylation mediated by the presence of the KIT oncogenic mutation D816V also increases the presence of MITF in the cytoplasm.

== Interactions ==
Most transcription factors function in cooperation with other factors by protein–protein interactions. Association of MITF with other proteins is a critical step in the regulation of MITF-mediated transcriptional activity. Some commonly studied MITF interactions include those with MAZR, PIAS3, Tfe3, hUBC9, PKC1, and LEF1. Looking at the variety of structures gives insight into MITF's varied roles in the cell.

The Myc-associated zinc-finger protein related factor (MAZR) interacts with the Zip domain of MITF. When expressed together, both MAZR and MITF increase promoter activity of the mMCP-6 gene. MAZR and MITF together transactivate the mMCP-6 gene. MAZR also plays a role in the phenotypic expression of mast cells in association with MITF.

PIAS3 is a transcriptional inhibitor that acts by inhibiting STAT3's DNA binding activity. PIAS3 directly interacts with MITF, and STAT3 does not interfere with the interaction between PIAS3 and MITF. PIAS3 functions as a key molecule in suppressing the transcriptional activity of MITF. This is important when considering mast cell and melanocyte development.

MITF, TFE3 and TFEB are part of the basic helix-loop-helix-leucine zipper family of transcription factors. Each protein encoded by the family of transcription factors can bind DNA. MITF is necessary for melanocyte and eye development and new research suggests that TFE3 is also required for osteoclast development, a function redundant of MITF. The combined loss of both genes results in severe osteopetrosis, pointing to an interaction between MITF and other members of its transcription factor family. In turn, TFEB has been termed as the master regulator of lysosome biogenesis and autophagy. Interestingly, MITF, TFEB and TFE3 separate roles in modulating starvation-induced autophagy have been described in melanoma. Moreover, MITF and TFEB proteins, directly regulate each other's mRNA and protein expression while their subcellular localization and transcriptional activity are subject to similar modulation, such as the mTOR signaling pathway.

UBC9 is a ubiquitin conjugating enzyme whose proteins associates with MITF. Although hUBC9 is known to act preferentially with SENTRIN/SUMO1, an in vitro analysis demonstrated greater actual association with MITF. hUBC9 is a critical regulator of melanocyte differentiation. To do this, it targets MITF for proteasome degradation.

Protein kinase C-interacting protein 1 (PKC1) associates with MITF. Their association is reduced upon cell activation. When this happens MITF disengages from PKC1. PKC1 by itself, found in the cytosol and nucleus, has no known physiological function. It does, however, have the ability to suppress MITF transcriptional activity and can function as an in vivo negative regulator of MITF induced transcriptional activity.

The functional cooperation between MITF and the lymphoid enhancing factor (LEF-1) results in a synergistic transactivation of the dopachrome tautomerase gene promoter, which is an early melanoblast marker. LEF-1 is involved in the process of regulation by Wnt signaling. LEF-1 also cooperates with MITF-related proteins like TFE3. MITF is a modulator of LEF-1, and this regulation ensures efficient propagation of Wnt signals in many cells.

== Translational regulation ==
Translational regulation of MITF is still an unexplored area with only two peer-reviewed papers (as of 2019) highlighting the importance. During glutamine starvation of melanoma cells ATF4 transcripts increases as well as the translation of the mRNA due to eIF2α phosphorylation. This chain of molecular events leads to two levels of MITF suppression: first, ATF4 protein binds and suppresses MITF transcription and second, eIF2α blocks MITF translation possibly through the inhibition of eIF2B by eIF2α.

MITF can also be directly translationally modified by the RNA helicase DDX3X. The 5' UTR of MITF contains important regulatory elements (IRES) that is recognized, bound and activated by DDX3X. Although, the 5' UTR of MITF only consists of a nucleotide stretch of 123-nt, this region is predicted to fold into energetically favorable RNA secondary structures including multibranched loops and asymmetric bulges that is characteristics of IRES elements. Activation of this cis-regulatory sequences by DDX3X promotes MITF expression in melanoma cells.

== See also ==
- Microphthalmia
- Splashed white
