= Diadenosine hexaphosphate hydrolase (ATP-forming) =

Class of enzymes

Identifiers
- EC no.: 3.6.1.61

Databases
- BRENDA: enzyme data
- ExPASy: NiceZyme view
- KEGG: enzyme entry
- MetaCyc: metabolic pathway
- Rhea: reactions
- PDB structures: RCSB PDB PDBe PDBsum
Search
- PMC: articles
- PubMed: articles
- NCBI: proteins

Diadenosine hexaphosphate hydrolase (ATP-forming) (EC 3.6.1.61, Ndx1) is an enzyme characterised from Thermus thermophilus with systematic name P1,P6-bis(5'-adenosyl)hexaphosphate nucleotidohydrolase (ATP-forming). It catalyses several related hydrolysis reactions and is named after the one which converts diadenosine hexaphosphate (Ap6A) to give two molecules of adenosine triphosphate (ATP):

Ap6A (n=6)
H_{2}O
2
adenosine triphosphate

The enzyme also converts diadenosine pentaphosphate (Ap5A) to ATP and adenosine diphosphate:

Ap5A (n=5}
H_{2}O
ATP +
adenosine diphosphate

With diadenosine tetraphosphate (Ap4A) the products are ATP and adenosine monophosphate:

Ap4A (n=4}
H_{2}O
ATP +
adenosine monophosphate

The enzyme requires the presence of the divalent cations (Mn^{2+}, Mg^{2+}, Zn^{2+}, and Co^{2+}). It is found in other organisms including yeast, and humans. It is a member of the NUDIX hydrolase group.
