= Aminoacyl tRNA synthase complex-interacting multifunctional protein 2 =

Protein-coding gene in the species Homo sapiens

AIMP2
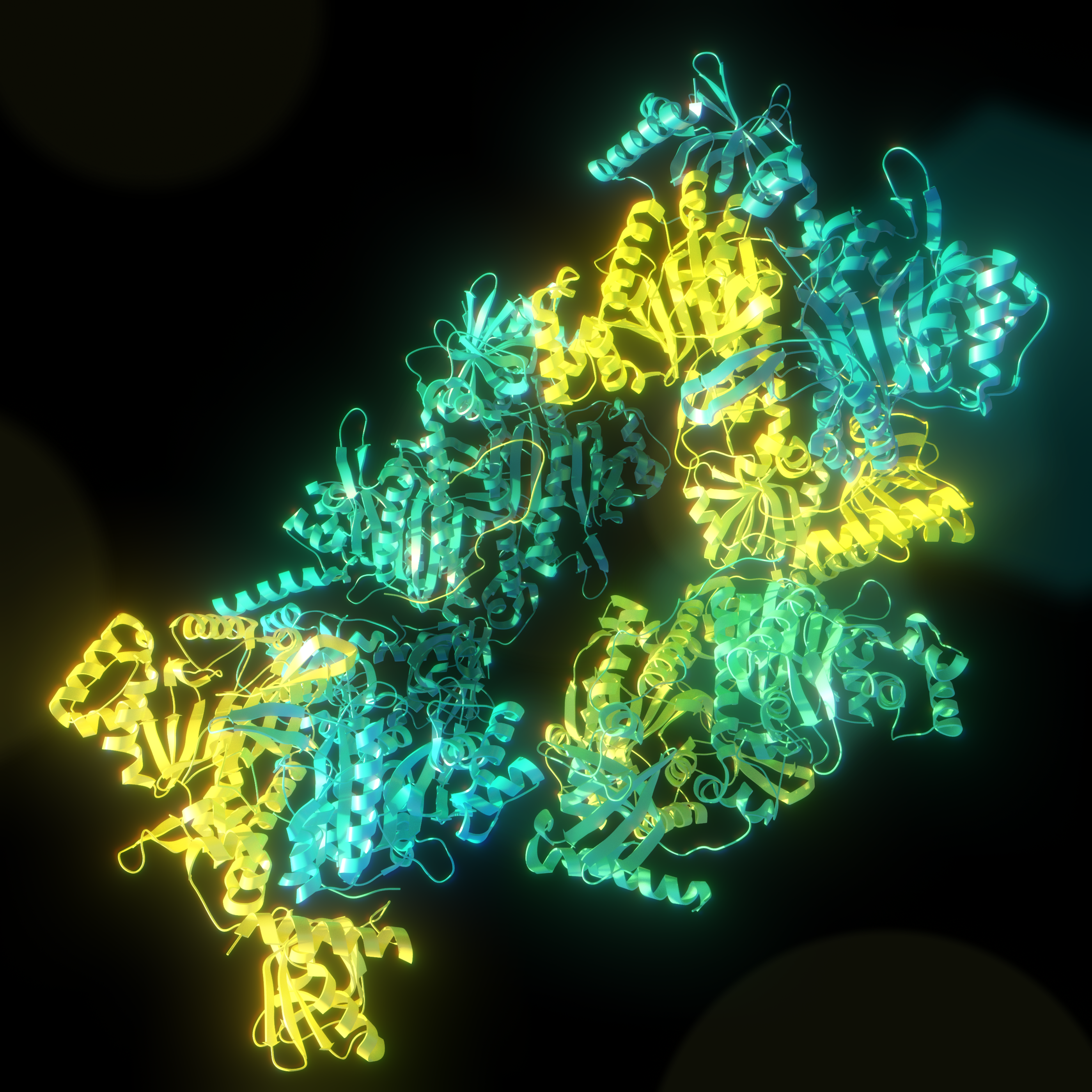
Available structures
| PDB | Ortholog search: PDBe RCSB |
| PDB | List of PDB id codes 4DPG, 4YCU, 4YCW, 5A34, 5A1N, 5A5H |

Identifiers
- Aliases: AIMP2, JTV-1, JTV1, P38, PRO0992, Multisynthetase complex auxiliary component p38, aminoacyl tRNA synthetase complex interacting multifunctional protein 2, HLD17
- External IDs: OMIM: 600859; MGI: 2385237; HomoloGene: 4594; GeneCards: AIMP2; OMA:AIMP2 - orthologs

Gene location (Human)
| Chr. | Chromosome 7 (human) |
| Band | 7p22.1 | Start | 6,009,255 bp |
| Band | 7p22.1 | End | 6,023,834 bp |

Gene location (Mouse)
| Chr. | Chromosome 5 (mouse) |
| Band | 5|5 G2 | Start | 143,839,522 bp |
| Band | 5|5 G2 | End | 143,846,665 bp |
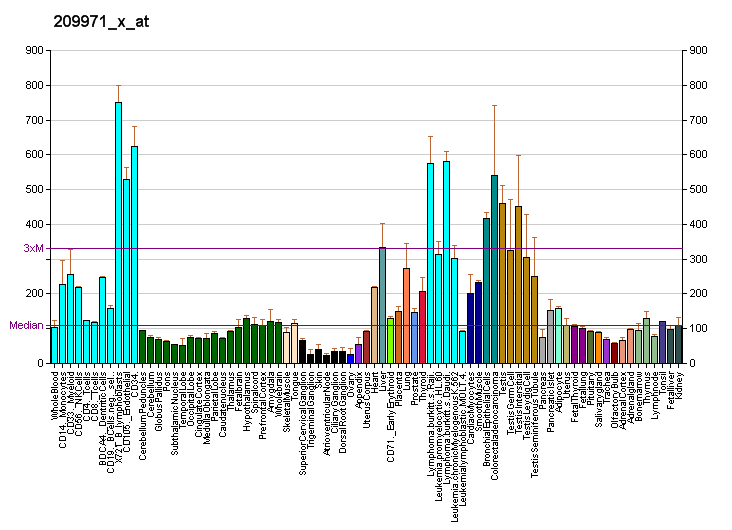

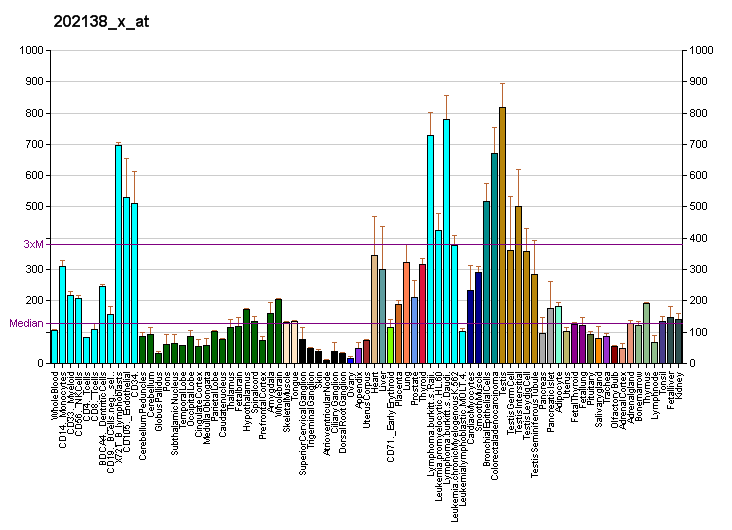

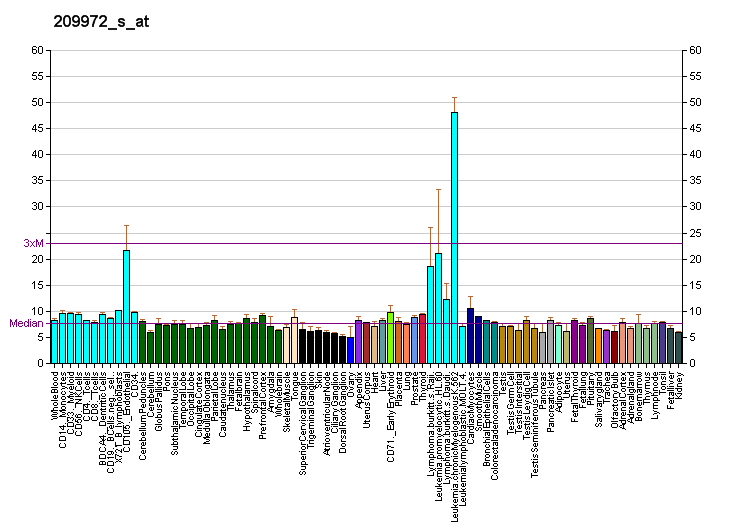
RNA expression pattern
| Bgee | Human / Mouse (ortholog); Top expressed in: oocyte; secondary oocyte; tibialis anterior muscle; vastus lateralis muscle; deltoid muscle; body of tongue; muscle of arm; biceps brachii; gastrocnemius muscle; triceps brachii muscle / Top expressed in: triceps brachii muscle; quadriceps femoris muscle; vastus lateralis muscle; sternocleidomastoid muscle; gastrocnemius muscle; extensor digitorum longus muscle; plantaris muscle; temporal muscle; medial head of gastrocnemius muscle; tibialis anterior muscle; More reference expression data |
| BioGPS | More reference expression data |
Gene ontology
| Molecular function | protein binding; molecular adaptor activity |
| Cellular component | cytoplasm; membrane; nucleus; cytosol; aminoacyl-tRNA synthetase multienzyme complex |
| Biological process | multicellular organism development; cell differentiation; type II pneumocyte differentiation; positive regulation of neuron death; positive regulation of protein ubiquitination; tRNA aminoacylation for protein translation; protein biosynthesis; negative regulation of cell population proliferation; apoptotic process; positive regulation of aminoacyl-tRNA ligase activity; protein-containing complex assembly |
Sources:Amigo / QuickGO
Orthologs
| Species | Human | Mouse |
| Entrez | 7965 | 231872 |
| Ensembl | ENSG00000106305 | ENSMUSG00000029610 |
| UniProt | Q13155 | Q8R010 |
| RefSeq (mRNA) | NM_006303; NM_001326606; NM_001326607; NM_001326609; NM_001326611 NM_018570; NM_001326610; NM_001362785; NM_001362787 | NM_001172146; NM_146165 |
| RefSeq (protein) | NP_001313535; NP_001313536; NP_001313538; NP_001313539; NP_001313540 NP_006294; NP_001349714; NP_001349716 | NP_001165617; NP_666277 |
| Location (UCSC) | Chr 7: 6.01 – 6.02 Mb | Chr 5: 143.84 – 143.85 Mb |
| PubMed search |
- Wikidata
| View/Edit Human | View/Edit Mouse |

Aminoacyl tRNA synthetase complex-interacting multifunctional protein 2 (AIMP2) is an enzyme that in humans is encoded by the AIMP2 gene. AIMP2 is also known as Multisynthetase complex auxiliary component p38, and JTV1.

== Function ==
The AIMP2 gene is located on chromosome 7p22 flanked by two genes, HRI and PMS2. AIMP2 and HRI overlap slightly and are arranged in a tail-to-tail fashion. AIMP2 and PMS2 are separated by approximately 200 base pairs and are arranged head-to-head. AIMP2 is transcribed in the opposite direction compared to HRI and PMS2. The function of the AIMP2 gene product is unknown.

== Interactions ==
AIMP2 has been shown to interact with Parkin, P53 and KARS.
