= Tietz syndrome =

Congenital disorder

- Other names: Hypopigmentation-deafness syndrome
- Tietz syndrome has an autosomal dominant pattern of inheritance.
- Specialty: Pediatrics

Tietz syndrome, also called Tietz albinism-deafness syndrome or albinism and deafness of Tietz, is an autosomal dominant congenital disorder characterized by deafness and leucism. It is caused by a mutation in the microphthalmia-associated transcription factor (MITF) gene. Tietz syndrome was first described in 1963 by Walter Tietz (1927–2003), a German physician working in California.

== Presentation ==
Tietz syndrome is characterized by profound hearing loss from birth, white hair and pale skin (hair color may darken over time to blond or red).

The hearing loss is caused by abnormalities of the inner ear (sensorineural hearing loss) and is present from birth. Individuals with Tietz syndrome often have skin and hair color that is lighter than those of other family members.

Tietz syndrome also affects the eyes. The iris in affected individuals is blue, and specialized cells in the eye called retinal pigment epithelial cells lack their normal pigment. The changes to these cells are generally detectable only by an eye examination; it is unclear whether the changes affect vision.

== Cause ==
Tietz syndrome is caused by mutations in the MITF gene, located on human chromosome 3p14.1-p12.3. It is inherited in an autosomal dominant manner. This indicates that the defective gene responsible for a disorder is located on an autosome (chromosome 3 is an autosome), and only one copy of the defective gene is sufficient to cause the disorder, when inherited from a parent who has the disorder.

== Treatment ==
There is currently no treatment or cure for Tietz syndrome. The symptom most likely to be of practical importance is sensorineural deafness, and this is treated as any other irreversible deafness would be. In marked cases, there may be cosmetic issues. Other abnormalities (neurological, structural, Hirschsprung's disease) associated with the syndrome are treated symptomatically.

== See also ==
- List of cutaneous conditions
