= Lysine–tRNA ligase =

Class of enzymes

Identifiers
- EC no.: 6.1.1.6
- CAS no.: 9031-26-9

Databases
- BRENDA: enzyme data
- ExPASy: NiceZyme view
- KEGG: enzyme entry
- MetaCyc: metabolic pathway
- Rhea: reactions
- PDB structures: RCSB PDB PDBe PDBsum
- Gene Ontology: AmiGO / QuickGO
Search
- PMC: articles
- PubMed: articles
- NCBI: proteins

In enzymology, lysine–tRNA ligases (EC 6.1.1.6) are a type of enzyme. In humans the known enzyme of this type is encoded by the gene KARS1. More generally, lysine–tRNA ligases catalyze the chemical reaction

ATP + L-lysine + tRNA^{Lys} $\rightleftharpoons$ AMP + diphosphate + L-lysyl-tRNA^{Lys}

The 3 substrates of this enzyme are ATP, L-lysine, and tRNA^{Lys}, whereas its 3 products are AMP, diphosphate, and L-lysyl-tRNA^{Lys}. Besides the enzyme encoded by KARS, the lysX protein found in some bacteria, and the cla4 protein found in the fungus Cladosporium cladosporioides are also able to catalyze this type of reaction.

This enzyme participates in 3 metabolic pathways: lysine biosynthesis, aminoacyl-trna biosynthesis, and amyotrophic lateral sclerosis (als).

== Nomenclature ==
This enzyme belongs to the family of ligases, to be specific, those forming carbon–oxygen bonds in aminoacyl-tRNA and related compounds. The systematic name of this enzyme class is L-lysine:tRNA^{Lys} ligase (AMP-forming). Other names in common use include lysyl-tRNA synthetase, lysyl-transfer ribonucleate synthetase, lysyl-transfer RNA synthetase, L-lysine-transfer RNA ligase, lysine-tRNA synthetase, and lysine translase.
