= INPP4B =

Protein-coding gene in the species Homo sapiens

Identifiers
- Aliases: INPP4B, inositol polyphosphate-4-phosphatase type II B
- External IDs: OMIM: 607494; MGI: 2158925; GeneCards: INPP4B
Enzyme activity
EC #	BRENDA	ExPASy	KEGG	MetaCyc
3.1.3.66	↗	↗	↗	↗

Gene location (Human)
Chr.	Chromosome 4 (human)
Band	4q31.21	Start	142,023,160 bp
Band	4q31.21	End	142,847,432 bp

Gene location (Mouse)
Chr.	Chromosome 8 (mouse)
Band	8 C2|8 39.02 cM	Start	82,069,185 bp
Band	8 C2|8 39.02 cM	End	82,854,543 bp
RNA expression pattern
Bgee	Human / Mouse (ortholog); Top expressed in: sperm; Achilles tendon; left testis; right testis; superficial temporal artery; epithelium of colon; sural nerve; parietal pleura; visceral pleura; mucosa of paranasal sinus / Top expressed in: lumbar subsegment of spinal cord; soleus muscle; lymph node; mesenteric lymph nodes; intercostal muscle; myocardium of ventricle; thymus; blood; substantia nigra; genital tubercle; More reference expression data
BioGPS	n/a
Gene ontology
Molecular function	phosphatidylinositol-4,5-bisphosphate 4-phosphatase activity; protein binding; hydrolase activity; inositol-3,4-bisphosphate 4-phosphatase activity; inositol-1,3,4-trisphosphate 4-phosphatase activity; phosphatidylinositol-3,4-bisphosphate 4-phosphatase activity
Cellular component	cytosol; cytoplasm
Biological process	phosphatidylinositol biosynthetic process; phosphatidylinositol-3-phosphate biosynthetic process; inositol phosphate metabolic process; signal transduction; dephosphorylation
Sources:Amigo / QuickGO
Orthologs
Databases	NCBI: entry; OMA: entry
Species	Human	Mouse
Entrez	8821	234515
Ensembl	ENSG00000109452	ENSMUSG00000037940
UniProt	O15327	Q6P1Y8
RefSeq (mRNA)	NM_001101669; NM_003866; NM_001331040	NM_001024617; NM_001297591; NM_001297593; NM_001297596
RefSeq (protein)	NP_001095139; NP_001317969; NP_003857	NP_001019788; NP_001284520; NP_001284522; NP_001284525
Location (UCSC)	Chr 4: 142.02 – 142.85 Mb	Chr 8: 82.07 – 82.85 Mb
PubMed search
- Wikidata
View/Edit Human	View/Edit Mouse

Inositol polyphosphate-4-phosphatase, type II, 105kDa is a protein that in humans is encoded by the INPP4B gene.

INPP4B encodes the inositol polyphosphate 4-phosphatase type II, a dual specificity phosphatase. INPP4B is involved in phosphatidylinositol signaling pathways. This enzyme removes the phosphate group at position 4 of the inositol ring from inositol 3,4-bisphosphate and phosphate groups from phosphotyrosines. There is limited data to suggest that the human type II enzyme is subject to alternative splicing, as has been established for the type I enzyme.
