= KARS1 =

Protein-coding gene in the species Homo sapiens

Identifiers
- Aliases: KARS1, KARS2, CMTRIB, lysyl-tRNA synthetase 1, KRS, Lysyl-tRNA synthetase, KARS, DFNB89, LEPID, DEAPLE
- External IDs: OMIM: 601421; MGI: 1934754; GeneCards: KARS1
Available structures
PDB	Ortholog search: PDBe RCSB
PDB	List of PDB id codes 3BJU, 4DPG, 4YCU, 4YCW
Enzyme activity
EC #	BRENDA	ExPASy	KEGG	MetaCyc
6.1.1.6	↗	↗	↗	↗

Gene location (Human)
Chr.	Chromosome 16 (human)
Band	16q23.1	Start	75,627,474 bp
Band	16q23.1	End	75,648,643 bp

Gene location (Mouse)
Chr.	Chromosome 8 (mouse)
Band	8 E1|8 58.27 cM	Start	112,720,075 bp
Band	8 E1|8 58.27 cM	End	112,737,955 bp
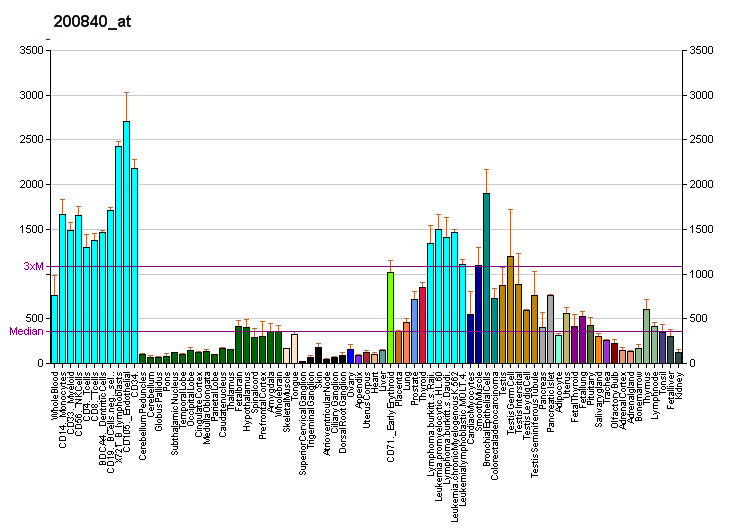
RNA expression pattern
Bgee	Human / Mouse (ortholog); Top expressed in: gingival epithelium; parietal pleura; visceral pleura; epithelium of nasopharynx; skin of hip; parotid gland; endothelial cell; Skeletal muscle tissue of biceps brachii; tibialis anterior muscle; deltoid muscle / Top expressed in: primitive streak; epiblast; yolk sac; otic vesicle; ventricular zone; tail of embryo; otic placode; embryo; embryo; fetal liver hematopoietic progenitor cell; More reference expression data
BioGPS	More reference expression data
Gene ontology
Molecular function	aminoacyl-tRNA ligase activity; nucleotide binding; amino acid binding; tRNA binding; lysine-tRNA ligase activity; ligase activity; protein binding; nucleic acid binding; ATP binding; ATP adenylyltransferase activity; protein homodimerization activity; transferase activity; identical protein binding
Cellular component	membrane; plasma membrane; extracellular region; mitochondrial matrix; mitochondrion; extracellular space; aminoacyl-tRNA synthetase multienzyme complex; nucleus; cytoplasm; cytosol
Biological process	protein biosynthesis; tRNA processing; tRNA aminoacylation for protein translation; lysyl-tRNA aminoacylation; viral process; basophil activation involved in immune response; negative regulation of cell population proliferation; positive regulation of macrophage chemotaxis; tumor necrosis factor-mediated signaling pathway; positive regulation of macrophage activation; positive regulation of transcription, DNA-templated; ERK1 and ERK2 cascade; positive regulation of ERK1 and ERK2 cascade; positive regulation of cytokine production involved in inflammatory response; positive regulation of p38MAPK cascade; positive regulation of metallopeptidase activity; diadenosine tetraphosphate biosynthetic process; response to X-ray
Sources:Amigo / QuickGO
Orthologs
Databases	NCBI: entry; OMA: entry
Species	Human	Mouse
Entrez	3735	85305
Ensembl	ENSG00000065427	ENSMUSG00000031948
UniProt	Q15046	Q99MN1
RefSeq (mRNA)	NM_005548; NM_001130089; NM_001378148	NM_001130868; NM_001286384; NM_053092; NM_001363429; NM_001363430
RefSeq (protein)	NP_001123561; NP_005539; NP_001365077	NP_001124340; NP_001273313; NP_444322; NP_001350358; NP_001350359
Location (UCSC)	Chr 16: 75.63 – 75.65 Mb	Chr 8: 112.72 – 112.74 Mb
PubMed search
- Wikidata
View/Edit Human	View/Edit Mouse

Lysine–tRNA ligase (also called Lysyl-tRNA synthetase) is an enzyme that in humans is encoded by the KARS1 gene (previously KARS). As a lysine–tRNA ligase, this enzyme acts to attach the amino acid lysine to the corresponding transfer RNA (tRNA^{Lys}) as part of RNA-to-protein translation and protein synthesis.

== Function ==
Aminoacyl-tRNA synthetases are a class of enzymes that charge tRNAs with their cognate amino acids. Lysyl-tRNA synthetase is a homodimer localized to the cytoplasm which belongs to the class II family of tRNA synthetases. It has been shown to be a target of autoantibodies in the human autoimmune diseases, polymyositis or dermatomyositis

Besides its role in translation, Lysyl-tRNA synthetase is involved in a signaling pathway leading to gene activation. Following physiological stimulation of a variety of cells, Lysyl-tRNA synthetase binds to the transcription factors MITF and USF2 and can then influence their transcriptional activities. Such physiological stimulation includes immunological activation of mast cells, so this pathway maybe relevant to the allergic response.

== Interactions ==
KARS1 has been shown to interact with Multisynthetase complex auxiliary component p38. Physiological trigger such as immunological activation results in the phosphorylation of LysRS on its serine residues. It separates from the multisynthetase complex and initiates Ap4A production.

== Medical significance ==
Pathogenic (compound heterozygous) mutations in KARS1 are associated with developmental delays and peripheral nervous system disfunction, in particular, a form of Charcot-Marie-Tooth disease called recessive intermediate Charcot-Marie-Tooth disease B (CMTRIB).
