= FERM domain-containing protein 4A =

Protein-coding gene in the species Homo sapiens

FRMD4A

Identifiers
- Aliases: FRMD4A, FRMD4, bA295P9.4, CCAFCA, FERM domain containing 4A, FERM Domain Containing 4A
- External IDs: OMIM: 616305; MGI: 1919850; GeneCards: FRMD4A

Gene location (Human)
Chr.	Chromosome 10 (human)
Band	10p13	Start	13,643,706 bp
Band	10p13	End	14,462,142 bp

Gene location (Mouse)
Chr.	Chromosome 2 (mouse)
Band	2|2 A1	Start	4,022,528 bp
Band	2|2 A1	End	4,618,854 bp
RNA expression pattern
Bgee	Human / Mouse (ortholog); Top expressed in: sural nerve; ganglionic eminence; oocyte; adipose tissue; subcutaneous adipose tissue; left coronary artery; abdominal fat; popliteal artery; tibial arteries; corpus callosum / Top expressed in: hand; superior cervical ganglion; trigeminal ganglion; sciatic nerve; otolith organ; ureter; utricle; endothelial cell of lymphatic vessel; hair follicle; vestibular sensory epithelium; More reference expression data
BioGPS	n/a
Gene ontology
Molecular function	protein-macromolecule adaptor activity
Cellular component	cytoplasm; bicellular tight junction; cytoskeleton; adherens junction; cell junction
Biological process	establishment of epithelial cell polarity; negative regulation of protein secretion; positive regulation of protein secretion
Sources:Amigo / QuickGO
Orthologs
Databases	NCBI: entry; OMA: entry
Species	Human	Mouse
Entrez	55691	209630
Ensembl	ENSG00000151474	ENSMUSG00000026657
UniProt	Q9P2Q2; Q5T376	Q8BIE6
RefSeq (mRNA)	NM_018027; NM_001318336; NM_001318337; NM_001318338	NM_001177843; NM_001177844; NM_172475; NM_001347086
RefSeq (protein)	NP_001305265; NP_001305266; NP_001305267; NP_060497	NP_001171314; NP_001171315; NP_001334015; NP_766063
Location (UCSC)	Chr 10: 13.64 – 14.46 Mb	Chr 2: 4.02 – 4.62 Mb
PubMed search
- Wikidata
View/Edit Human	View/Edit Mouse

FERM domain-containing protein 4A is a protein which is encoded by the FRMD4A gene, located on human Chromosome 10 at 10p13.
