= Ap4A =

Names
- IUPAC name O^{1},O^{7}-Di(5′-deoxyadenosin-5′-yl) tetrahydrogen tetraphosphate
- Systematic IUPAC name O^{1},O^{7}-Bis{[(2R,3S,4R,5R)-5-(6-amino-9H-purin-9-yl)-3,4-dihydroxyoxolan-2-yl]methyl} tetrahydrogen tetraphosphate
- Other names Diadenosine tetraphosphate; 5',5'''-Diadenosine tetraphosphate; AppppA

Identifiers
CAS Number	5542-28-9
3D model (JSmol)	Interactive image
ChEBI	CHEBI:17422
ChEMBL	ChEMBL339385
ChemSpider	20402
KEGG	C01260
PubChem CID	21706
- InChI: InChI=1S/C20H28N10O19P4/c21-15-9-17(25-3-23-15)29(5-27-9)19-13(33)11(31)7(45-19)1-43-50(35,36)47-52(39,40)49-53(41,42)48-51(37,38)44-2-8-12(32)14(34)20(46-8)30-6-28-10-16(22)24-4-26-18(10)30/h3-8,11-14,19-20,31-34H,1-2H2,(H,35,36)(H,37,38)(H,39,40)(H,41,42)(H2,21,23,25)(H2,22,24,26)/t7-,8-,11-,12-,13-,14-,19-,20-/m1/s1 Key: YOAHKNVSNCMZGQ-XPWFQUROSA-N
- SMILES: C1=NC2=C(C(=N1)N)N=CN2[C@H]3[C@@H]([C@@H]([C@H](O3)COP(=O)(O)OP(=O)(O)OP(=O)(O)OP(=O)(O)OC[C@@H]4[C@H]([C@H]([C@@H](O4)N5C=NC6=C5N=CN=C6N)O)O)O)O

Properties
Chemical formula	C_{20}H_{28}N_{10}O_{19}P_{4}
Molar mass	836.390 g·mol^{−1}
- Except where otherwise noted, data are given for materials in their standard state (at 25 °C [77 °F], 100 kPa). Infobox references

Diadenosine tetraphosphate or Ap4A is a putative alarmone, ubiquitous in nature being common to everything from bacteria to humans. It is made up of two adenosines joined together by a 5′-5′ linked chain of four phosphates. Adenosine polyphosphates are capable of inducing multiple physiological effects.

== Function ==
=== In Eukaryotes ===
Ap4A can be created by a non-canonical activity of the Lysyl-tRNA synthetase (LysRS). This function of LysRS is activated by the phosphorylation of LysRS on serine 207, its subsequent dissociation from the multi-synthetase complex (MSC). The molecule's role as a second messenger has recently been discovered in The LysRS-Ap4A-MITF signaling pathway. Ap4A binds to the MITF-HINT1 inhibitory complex, specifically to the molecule histidine triad nucleotide–binding protein 1(HINT1), releasing the Microphthalmia-associated transcription factor (MITF) and causing an increase in the transcription of its target genes. Ap4A also positively regulates the activity of the transcription factor USF2 through a similar molecular mechanism to that of MITF.

It has also been shown, that Ap4A plays a role in the functionality of dendritic cells (DCs). An increase in the intracellular amount Improves their motility and antigen presenting ability through alterations in small GTPases present in the cells. This was discovered by creating mice deficient in the enzyme NUDT2, which serves as an Ap4A hydrolase and thus controls the levels of Ap4A in the cell. Ap4A, however, has also been shown to cause apoptosis in several cell lines through an unknown mechanism, the degradation of Ap4A was necessary for the process as hydrolysis-resistant analogues of the molecule showed no apoptotic activity.

=== In Prokaryotes ===
In E. coli, Ap4A has been shown to function as an alarmone, as the intracellular concentration of the molecule increases upon heat stress. Ap4A can also be incorporated into RNA as a 5' Cap along with other dinucleoside polyphosphates. It serves as a substrate for the RNA polymerase and the intracellular levels of these capped RNAs increase upon stress, suggesting that the cap adds a level of stability to the RNA.

Myxococcus xanthus is a type of Gram-negative bacteria, and M. xanthus lysyl-tRNA synthetase (LysS) is an enzyme from the bacteria that synthesizes diadenosine tetraphosphates (Ap4A) when adenosine triphosphate (ATP) is present. Diadenosine pentaphosphate (Ap5A) is synthesized from Ap4A with ATP.
