= Phosphoamidase =

Class of enzymes

Identifiers
- EC no.: 3.9.1.1
- CAS no.: 9001-79-0

Databases
- BRENDA: enzyme data
- ExPASy: NiceZyme view
- KEGG: enzyme entry
- MetaCyc: metabolic pathway
- Rhea: reactions
- PDB structures: RCSB PDB PDBe PDBsum
- Gene Ontology: AmiGO / QuickGO
Search
- PMC: articles
- PubMed: articles
- NCBI: proteins

Phosphoamidase (EC 3.9.1.1) is an enzyme characterised from mammalian spleen and liver that catalyzes the hydrolysis of phosphocreatine to creatine and orthophosphate:

phosphocreatine
H_{2}O
P_{i}
creatine

This enzyme is a hydrolase, specifically one acting on phosphorus-nitrogen bonds. The systematic name of this enzyme class is phosphamide hydrolase. This enzyme is also called creatine phosphatase.
