= INAVA =

Protein found in humans

Identifiers
- Aliases: INAVA, chromosome 1 open reading frame 106, C1orf106, innate immunity activator
- External IDs: OMIM: 618051; MGI: 1921579; GeneCards: INAVA

Gene location (Human)
Chr.	Chromosome 1 (human)
Band	1q32.1	Start	200,891,048 bp
Band	1q32.1	End	200,915,742 bp

Gene location (Mouse)
Chr.	Chromosome 1 (mouse)
Band	1 E4|1	Start	136,141,269 bp
Band	1 E4|1	End	136,162,002 bp
RNA expression pattern
Bgee	Human / Mouse (ortholog); Top expressed in: mucosa of ileum; jejunal mucosa; nasal epithelium; mucosa of colon; mucosa of sigmoid colon; mucosa of transverse colon; palpebral conjunctiva; pancreatic ductal cell; gingival epithelium; duodenum / Top expressed in: epithelium of stomach; left colon; lip; transitional epithelium of urinary bladder; ileum; duodenum; spermatid; right kidney; genital tubercle; yolk sac; More reference expression data
BioGPS	n/a
Gene ontology
Molecular function	protein binding
Cellular component	nucleus; cytoplasm
Biological process	pattern recognition receptor signaling pathway; cytokine production involved in immune response; response to peptidoglycan; response to muramyl dipeptide; positive regulation of interleukin-1 beta production; positive regulation of interleukin-10 production; positive regulation of interleukin-6 production; positive regulation of stress-activated MAPK cascade; positive regulation of I-kappaB kinase/NF-kappaB signaling; nucleotide-binding oligomerization domain containing 2 signaling pathway; reactive oxygen species biosynthetic process; immune system process; innate immune response; positive regulation of protein ubiquitination; adherens junction maintenance; intestinal epithelial structure maintenance
Sources:Amigo / QuickGO
Orthologs
Databases	NCBI: entry; OMA: entry
Species	Human	Mouse
Entrez	55765	67313
Ensembl	ENSG00000163362	ENSMUSG00000041605
UniProt	Q3KP66	Q7TN12
RefSeq (mRNA)	NM_001142569; NM_018265; NM_001367289; NM_001367290	NM_028872
RefSeq (protein)	NP_001136041; NP_060735; NP_001354218; NP_001354219	NP_083148; NP_001392081; NP_001392082; NP_001392083
Location (UCSC)	Chr 1: 200.89 – 200.92 Mb	Chr 1: 136.14 – 136.16 Mb
PubMed search
- Wikidata
View/Edit Human	View/Edit Mouse

Innate immunity activator protein, is a protein that in humans is encoded by the INAVA gene. This protein is involved in pattern recognition receptor signaling.

== Gene ==
=== Location ===
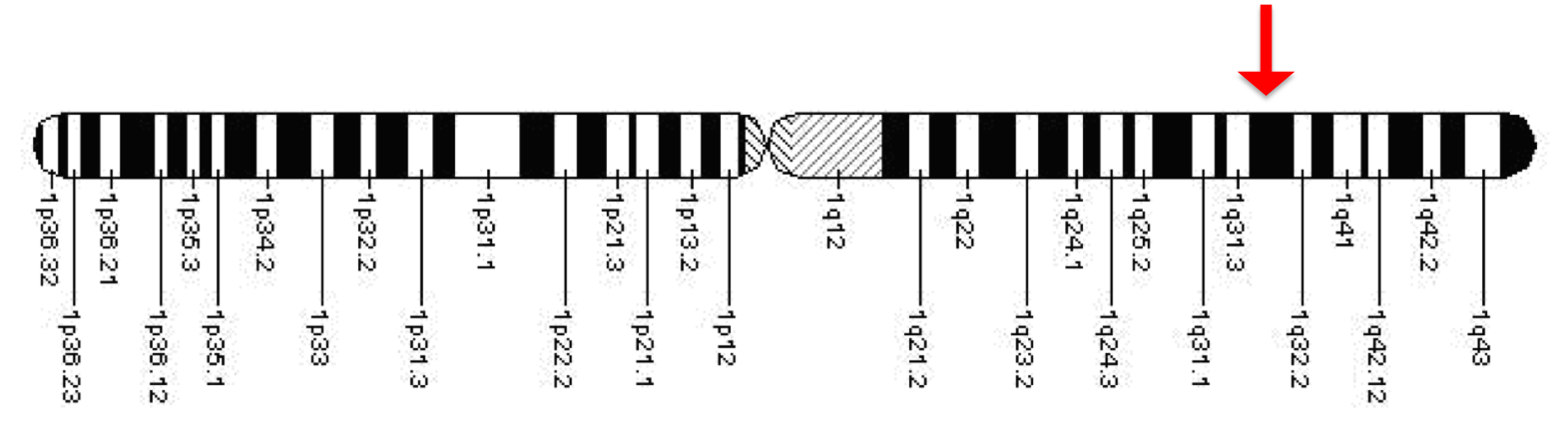
C1orf106 location on chromosome 1

In humans, INAVA is located on the long arm of chromosome 1 at locus 1q32.1. It spans from 200,891,499 to 200,915,736 (24.238 kb) on the plus strand.

=== Gene neighborhood ===
Gene neighborhood

INAVA is flanked by G protein-coupled receptor 25 (upstream) and maestro heat-like repeat family member 3 (MROH3P), a predicted downstream pseudogene. Ribosomal protein L34 pseudogene 6 (RPL34P6) is further upstream and kinesin family member 21B is further downstream.

=== Promoter ===
Predicted C1orf106 promoter region with putative transcription factor binding sites

There are seven predicted promoters for INAVA, and experimental evidence suggests that isoform 1 and 2, the most common isoforms, are transcribed using different promoters. MatInspector, a tool available through Genomatix, was used to predict transcription factor binding sites within potential promoter regions. The transcription factors that are predicted to target the anticipated promoter for isoform 1 are expressed in a range of tissues. The most common tissues of expression are the urogenital system, nervous system and bone marrow. This coincides with expression data for the INAVA protein, which is highly expressed in the kidney and bone marrow. A diagram of the predicted promoter region, with highlighted transcription factor binding sites, is shown to the right. The factors that are predicted to bind to the promoter region of isoform 2 differ, and twelve of the top twenty predicted factors are expressed in blood cells and/or tissues of the cardiovascular system.

=== Expression ===
C1orf106 is expressed in a wide range of tissues. Expression data from GEO profiles is shown below. The sites of highest expression, are listed in the table. Expression is moderate in the placenta, prostate, testis, lung, salivary glands and dendritic cells. It is low in the brain, most immune cells, the adrenal gland, uterus, heart and adipocytes. Expression data, from various experiments, found on GEO profiles suggests that INAVA expression is up-regulated in several cancers including: lung, ovarian, colorectal and breast.

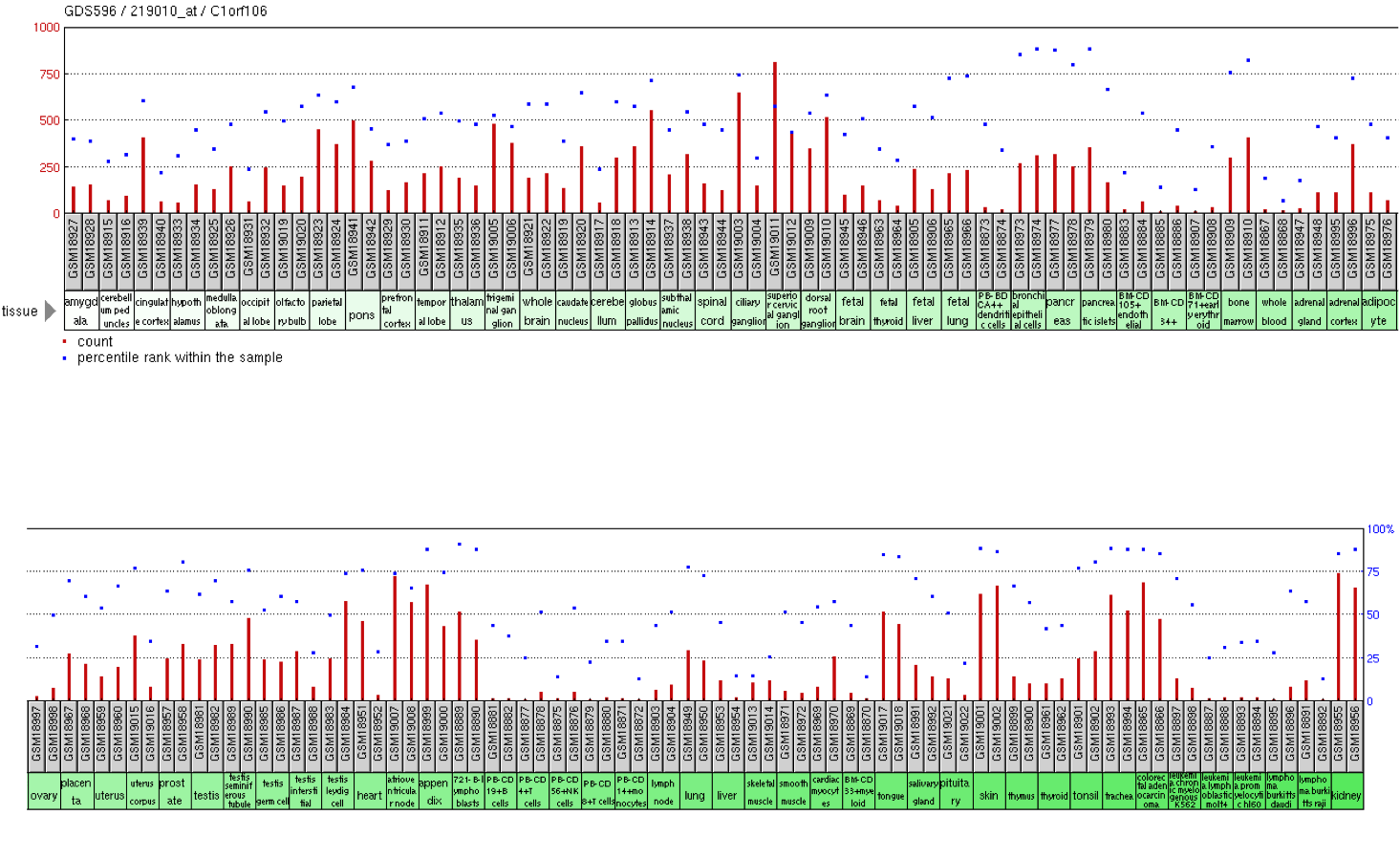
C1orf106 expression data from GEO profiles

Tissue	Percentile rank
B lymphocytes	90
Trachea	89
Skin	88
Human bronchial epithelial cells	88
Colorectal adenocarcinoma	87
Kidney	87
Tongue	85
Pancreas	84
Appendix	82
Bone marrow	80

== mRNA ==
=== Isoforms ===
Nine putative isoforms are produced from the INAVA gene, seven of which are predicted to encode proteins. Isoform 1 and 2, shown below, are the most common isoforms.

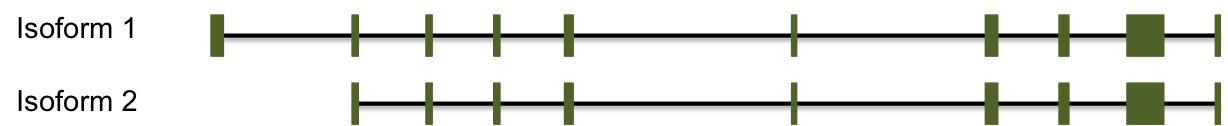
Most common C1orf106 isoforms

Isoform 1, which is the longest, is accepted as the canonical isoform. It contains ten exons, which encode a protein that is 677 amino acids long, depending on the source. Some sources report that the protein is only 663 amino acids due to the use of a start codon that is forty-two nucleotides downstream. According to NCBI, this isoform has only been predicted computationally. This may be because the Kozak sequence surrounding the downstream start codon is more similar to the consensus Kozak sequence as shown in the table below. Softberry was used to obtain the sequence of the predicted isoform. Isoform 2 is shorter due to a truncated N-terminus. Both isoforms have an alternative polyadenylation site.

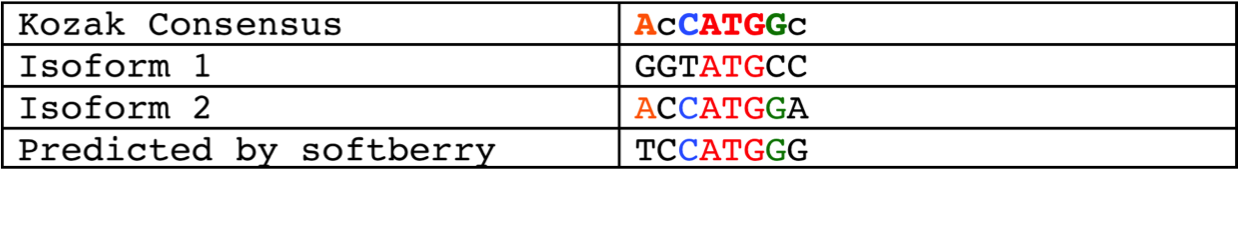
Surrounding sequence of start codons compared to Kozak consensus sequence

=== miRNA regulation ===
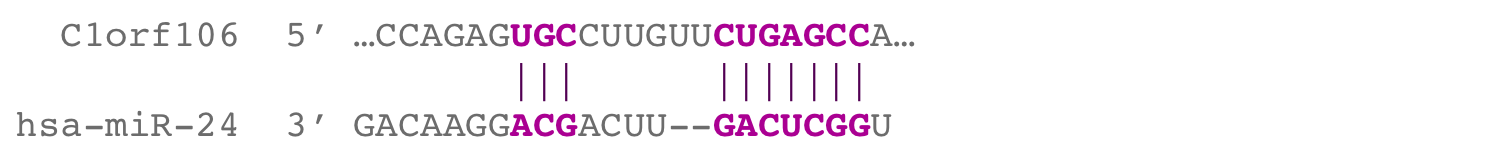
Predicted miRNA target sequence

miRNA-24 was identified as a microRNA that could potentially target INAVA mRNA. The binding site, which is located in the 5' untranslated region is shown.

== Protein ==
=== General properties ===
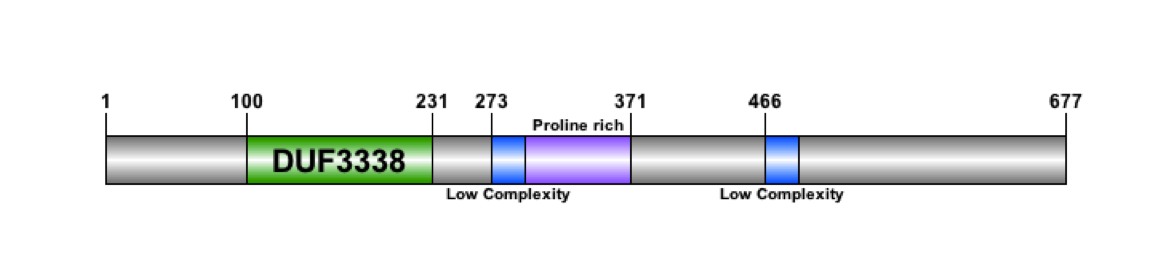
C1of106 protein (isoform 1)

Isoform 1, diagramed below, contains a DUF3338 domain, two low complexity regions and a proline rich region. The protein is arginine and proline rich, and has a lower than average amount of asparagine and hydrophobic amino acids, specifically phenylalanine and isoleucine. The isoelectric point is 9.58, and the molecular weight of the unmodified protein is 72.9 kdal. The protein is not predicted to have an N-terminal signal peptide, but there are predicted nuclear localization signals (NLS) and a leucine rich nuclear export signal.

=== Modifications ===
INAVA is predicted to be highly phosphorylated. Phosphorylation sites predicted by PROSITE are shown in the table below. NETPhos predictions are illustrated in the diagram. Each line points to a predicted phosphorylation site, and connects to a letter which represents either serine (S), threonine (T) or tyrosine (Y).

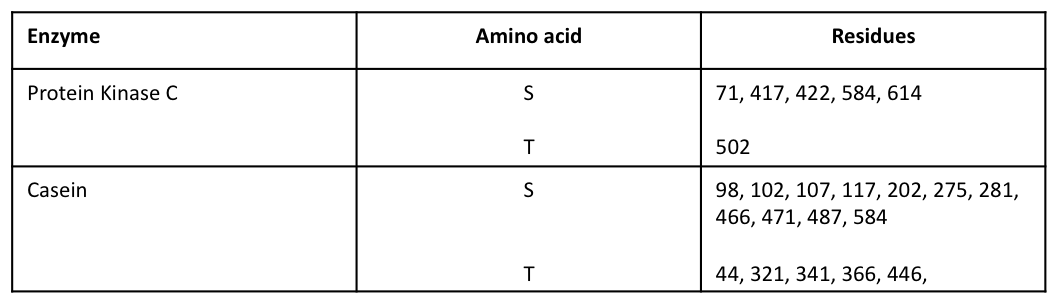
Phosphorylation sites predicted by PROSITE

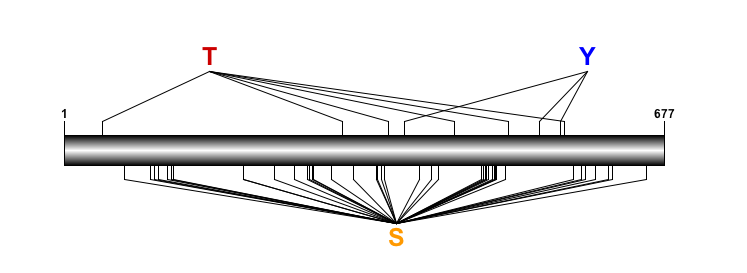
Phosphorylation sites predicted by NETPhos. Letter corresponds to serine (S), threonine (T) or tyrosine (Y).

=== Structure ===
Coiled-coils are predicted to span from residue 130-160 and 200–260. The secondary composition was predicted to be about 60% random coils, 30% alpha helices and 10% beta sheets.

=== Interactions ===
The proteins with which the INAVA protein interacts are not well characterized. Text mining evidence suggests INAVA may interact with the following proteins: DNAJC5G, SLC7A13, PIEZO2, MUC19. Experimental evidence, from a yeast two hybrid screen, suggests the INAVA protein interacts with 14-3-3 protein sigma, which is an adaptor protein.

=== Homology ===
INAVA is well conserved in vertebrates as shown in the table below. Sequences were retrieved from BLAST and BLAT.

	Sequence	Genus and species	Common name	NCBI accession	Length(aa)	Sequence identity	Time since divergence (Mya)
*	C1orf106	Homo sapiens	Human	NP_060735.3	667	100%	NA
*	C1orf106	Macaca fascicularis	Crab-eating macaque	XP_005540414.1	703	97%	29.0
*	LOC289399	Rattus norvegicus	Norway rat	NP_001178750.1	667	86%	92.3
*	Predicted C1orf106 homolog	Odobenus rosmarus divergens	Walrus	XP_004392787.1	672	85%	94.2
*	C1orf106-like	Loxodonta africana	Elephant	XP_003410255.1	663	84%	98.7
*	Predicted C1orf106 homolog	Dasypus novemcinctus	Nine-banded armadillo	XP_004478752.1	676	81%	104.2
*	Predicted C1orf106 homolog	Ochotona princeps	American pika	XP_004578841.1	681	78%	92.3
*	Predicted C1orf106 homolog	Monodelphis domestica	Gray short-tailed opossum	XP_001367913.2	578	76%	162.2
*	Predicted C1orf106 homolog	Chrysemys picta bellii	Painted turtle	XP_005313167.1	602	56%	296.0
*	Predicted C1orf106 homolog	Geospiza fortis	Medium ground finch	XP_005426868.1	542	50%	296.0
*	Predicted C1orf106 homolog	Alligator mississippiensis	Alligator	XP_006278041.1	547	49%	296.0
*	Predicted C1orf106 homolog	Ficedula albicollis	Collared flycatcher	XP_005059352.1	542	49%	296.0
	Predicted C1orf106 homolog	Latimeria chalumnae	West Indian Ocean coelacanth	XP_005988436.1	613	46%	414.9
*	Predicted C1orf106 homolog	Lepisosteus oculatus	Spotted gar	XP_006628420.1	637	44%	400.1
*	FERM domain containing 4A	Xenopus (Silurana) tropicalis	Western clawed frog	XP_002935289.2	695	43%	371.2
*	Predicted C1orf106 homolog	Oreochromis niloticus	Nile tilapia	XP_005478188.1	576	40%	400.1
	Predicted C1orf106 homolog	Haplochromis burtoni	Astatotilapia burtoni	XP_005914919.1	576	40%	400.1
	Predicted C1orf106 homolog	Pundamilia nyererei	Haplochromis nyererei	XP_005732720.1	577	40%	400.1
*	LOC563192	Danio rerio	Zebrafish	NP_001073474.1	612	37%	400.1
	LOC101161145	Oryzias latipes	Japanese rice fish	XP_004069287.1	612	33%	400.1

A graph of the sequence identity versus the time since divergence for the asterisked entries is shown below. The colors correspond to degree of relatedness (green = closely related, purple = distantly related).

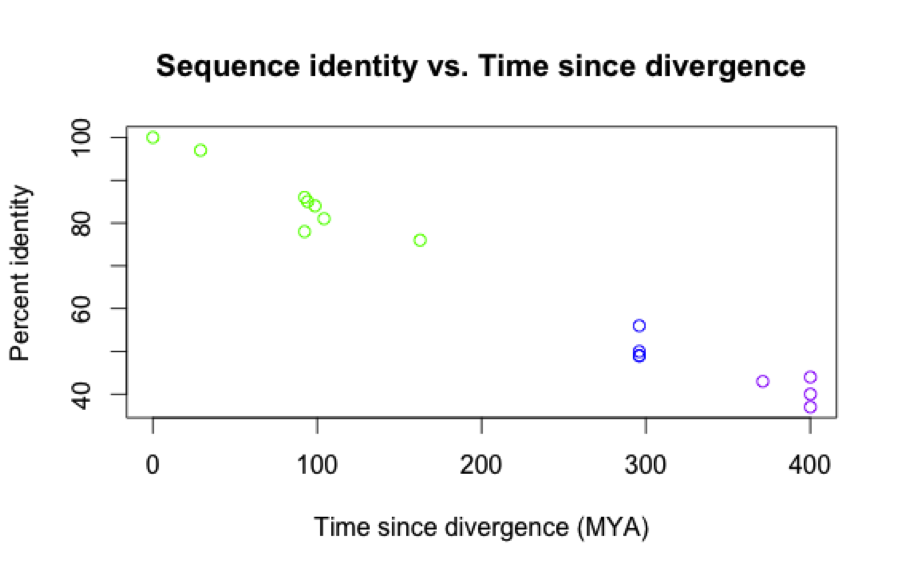
Percent sequence identity in relation to species relatedness

=== Paralogs ===
Proteins that are considered to be INAVA paralogs are not consistent between databases. A multiple sequence alignment (MSA) of potentially paralogous proteins was made to determine the likelihood of a truly paralogous relationship. The sequences were retrieved from a BLAST search in humans with the C1orf106 protein. The MSA suggests the proteins share a homologous domain, DUF3338, which is found in eukaryotes. A portion of the multiple sequence alignment is shown below. Apart from the DUF domain (boxed in green), there was little conservation. The DUF3338 domain does not have any extraordinary physical properties, however, one notable finding is that each of the proteins in the MSA is predicted to have two nuclear localization signals. The proteins in the MSA are all predicted to localize to the nucleus. A comparison of the physical properties of the proteins was also conducted using SAPS and is shown in the table.

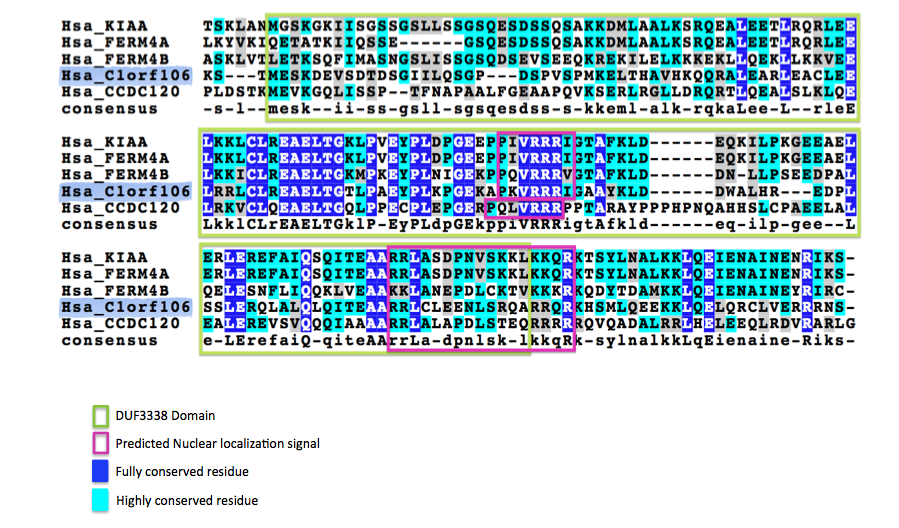
Conservation of the DUF3338 domain in humans

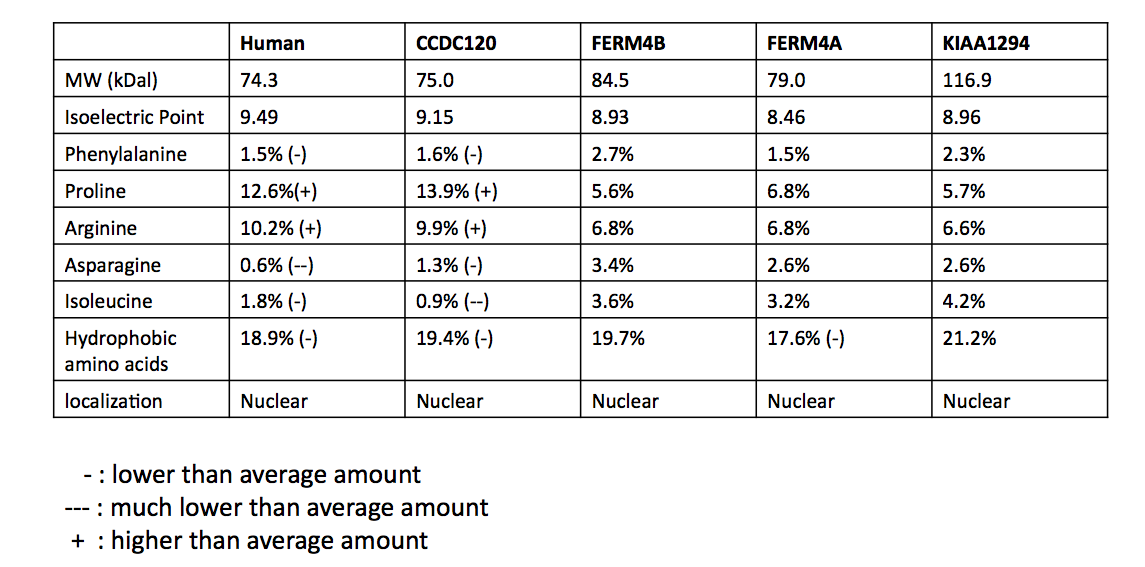
Physical properties of potential paralogs

== Clinical significance ==
Certain intronic and coding variants in INAVA have been associated with a greater susceptibility to inflammatory bowel disease, which has been designated inflammatory bowel disease-29 (IBD29).
