= FERM domain-containing protein 4B =

Protein found in humans

FRMD4B

Identifiers
- Aliases: FRMD4B, 6030440G05Rik, GRSP1, FERM domain containing 4B
- External IDs: OMIM: 617467; MGI: 2141794; GeneCards: FRMD4B

Gene location (Mouse)
Chr.	Chromosome 6 (mouse)
Band	6|6 D3	Start	97,263,828 bp
Band	6|6 D3	End	97,594,502 bp
RNA expression pattern
Bgee	Human / Mouse (ortholog); Top expressed in: germinal epithelium; Achilles tendon; sural nerve; corpus callosum; oral cavity; ganglionic eminence; parietal pleura; palpebral conjunctiva; inferior ganglion of vagus nerve; right lobe of thyroid gland / Top expressed in: ciliary body; stroma of bone marrow; vestibular membrane of cochlear duct; retinal pigment epithelium; conjunctival fornix; vestibular sensory epithelium; external carotid artery; Rostral migratory stream; Epithelium of choroid plexus; iris; More reference expression data
BioGPS	n/a
Orthologs
Databases	NCBI: entry
Species	Human	Mouse
Entrez	23150	232288
Ensembl	n/a	ENSMUSG00000030064
UniProt	Q9Y2L6	Q920B0
RefSeq (mRNA)	NM_015123	NM_145148; NM_001346637; NM_001346639
RefSeq (protein)	NP_055938	NP_001333566; NP_001333568; NP_660130
Location (UCSC)	n/a	Chr 6: 97.26 – 97.59 Mb
PubMed search
- Wikidata
View/Edit Human	View/Edit Mouse

FERM domain containing 4B is a protein that in humans is encoded by the FRMD4B gene.

== Function ==
This gene encodes a GRP1-binding protein which contains a FERM protein interaction domain as well as two coiled coil domains. This protein may play a role as a scaffolding protein.
