= FAM149B1 =

Protein-coding gene in humans

Identifiers
- Aliases: FAM149B1, KIAA0974, family with sequence similarity 149 member B1, JBTS36
- External IDs: OMIM: 618413; MGI: 2145567; GeneCards: FAM149B1

Gene location (Human)
| Chr. | Chromosome 10 (human) |
| Band | 10q22.2 | Start | 73,168,119 bp |
| Band | 10q22.2 | End | 73,244,504 bp |

Gene location (Mouse)
| Chr. | Chromosome 14 (mouse) |
| Band | 14|14 A3 | Start | 20,348,162 bp |
| Band | 14|14 A3 | End | 20,383,491 bp |
RNA expression pattern
| Bgee | Human / Mouse (ortholog); Top expressed in: C1 segment; ventricular zone; Achilles tendon; anterior cingulate cortex; left ovary; ganglionic eminence; right testis; left testis; amygdala; right ovary / Top expressed in: neural layer of retina; tail of embryo; saccule; yolk sac; genital tubercle; otic placode; ventricular zone; right kidney; spermatid; spermatocyte; More reference expression data |
| BioGPS | n/a |
Orthologs
| Databases | NCBI: entry; OMA: entry |
| Species | Human | Mouse |
| Entrez | 317662 | 105428 |
| Ensembl | ENSG00000138286 | ENSMUSG00000039599 |
| UniProt | Q96BN6 | Q6NSV7 |
| RefSeq (mRNA) | NM_173348 | NM_001024512; NM_001177633; NM_172379; NM_001360364; NM_001360365 |
| RefSeq (protein) | NP_775483 | NP_001019683; NP_001171104; NP_759011; NP_001347293; NP_001347294 |
| Location (UCSC) | Chr 10: 73.17 – 73.24 Mb | Chr 14: 20.35 – 20.38 Mb |
| PubMed search |
- Wikidata
| View/Edit Human | View/Edit Mouse |

The Primary cilium assembly protein FAM149B1 is a protein that in humans is encoded by the gene FAM149B1 (previously KIAA0974). This protein is involved in the assembly of cilia and the localization of proteins to the cilia. Pathogenic mutations are associated with Joubert syndrome.

== Gene ==
This gene has a possible 14 exons. It is located on the forward strand of chromosome 10 at 10q22.2 on the positive strand. The total span of the gene, including 5' and 3' UTR, is 3149 base pairs. The gene is flanked on the left by NUDT13 (nudix hydrolase 13) and on the right by DNAJC9-AS1 (DNAJC9 antisense RNA 1).

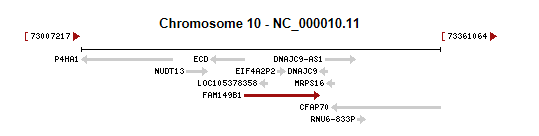
This figure shows the location of the FAM149B1 gene on Chromosome 10, and also displays the genes in the surrounding location.

=== Isoforms ===
The FAM149B1 protein has a possible 10 isoforms, which are determined through alternative splicing of the gene.

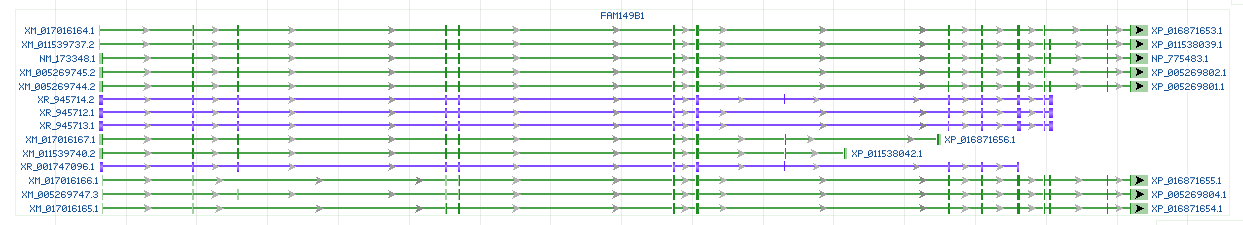
The various isoforms of the FAM149B1 gene

| Isoform Name | Accession | Exons | Length (bp) |
|---|---|---|---|
| Primary Transcript | NM_173348.1 | All (14) | 3149 |
| X1 | XM_005269744.2 | All (14) | 3108 |
| X2 | XM_011539737.2 | 13 | 2935 |
| X3 | XM_005269745.2 | 13 | 3006 |
| X4 | XM_017016164.1 | 12 | 2810 |
| X5 | XM_017016165.1 | 11 | 2779 |
| X6* | XM_017016166.1 | 9 | 2816 |
| X6* | XM_005269747.3 | 9 | 2923 |
| X7 | XM_017016167.1 | 9 | 1485 |
| X8 | XM_011539740.2 | 9 | 1447 |

== Protein ==
=== General properties ===
The primary protein encoded by the FAM149B1 gene is 583 amino acids in length and has a molecular weight of 64 kDal. The protein contains a conserved protein domain, DUF3719 located at the amino acids 115–179. The isoelectric point of the protein before post-translational modifications is 6.3, and this isoelectric point is relatively conserved in the protein's isoforms, especially in those with the most similar composition of exons. This protein is considered serine rich, in that it expresses a higher serine composition relative to the composition of other human proteins. This high serine composition is also seen in the gene's orthologues.

=== Splice variants ===
The splice variants of the protein demonstrate some shared qualities of the protein that is translated from the primary transcript. Because each isoform is a different length and contains various combinations of the available exons, there are variances in the isoelectric point and molecular weight. The isoforms closest to the weight and exon composition to the primary transcript generally share these characteristics. The protein isoforms missing the conserved DUF3719 domain are isoforms X5 and X6 because this domain is contained between exons 3–6.

| Isoform Name | Accession | Molecular Weight (kDal) | Length (aa) | Isoelectric point |
|---|---|---|---|---|
| Primary Transcript | NP_775483.1 | 64 | 582 | 6.3 |
| X1 | XP_005269801.1 | 63.7 | 574 | 6.3 |
| X2 | XP_011538039.1 | 62.6 | 560 | 7.5 |
| X3 | XP_005269802.1 | 59.8 | 540 | 6.4 |
| X4 | XP_016871653.1 | 57.8 | 518 | 7.7 |
| X5 | XP_016871654.1 | 53 | 476 | 6.8 |
| X6* | XP_016871655.1 | 46.6 | 419 | 7.5 |
| X6* | XP_005269804.1 | 46.6 | 419 | 7.5 |
| X7 | XP_016871656.1 | 41 | 368 | 5.1 |
| X8 | XP_011538042.1 | 38 | 348 | 5.2 |

=== Structure ===
There is a negative charge cluster from amino acids 212 to 239. Negative charge clusters often coordinate calcium, or magnesium or zinc ions, mannose-binding protein, or aminopeptidase. The protein contains no positive or mixed charge clusters. The secondary structure of the protein is predicted to be a combination of mostly alpha-helices with a few predicted beta-sheet structures.

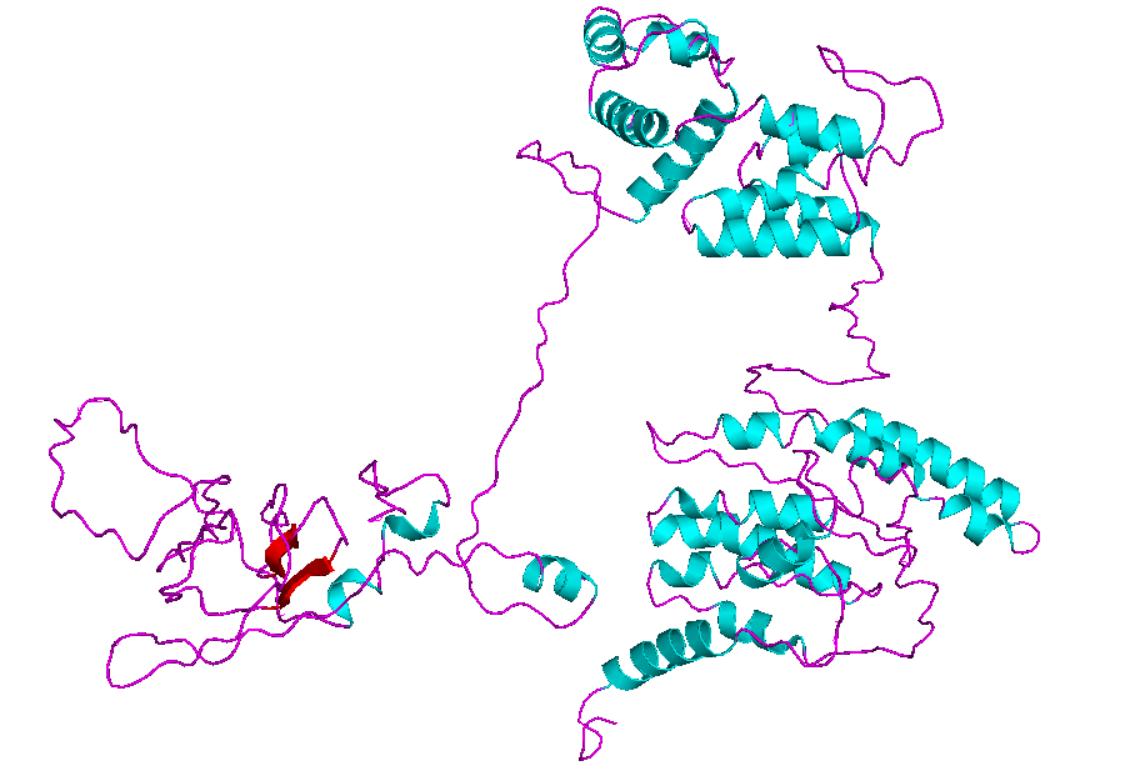
This figure shows the predicted 3D structure of the human FAM149B1 protein. The secondary structures contributing to the tertiary structure are alpha-helices and one predicted beta-sheet turn.

=== Subcellular localization ===
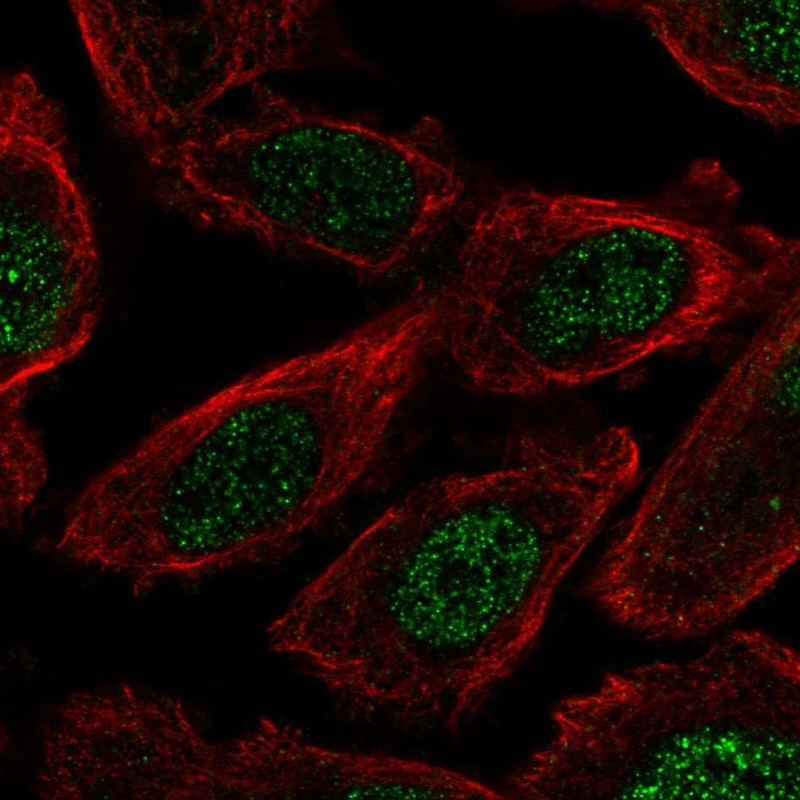
Immunofluorescent stain shows expression of FAM149B1 to be highly expressed in the nucleus.

The subcellular location of the protein is the nucleus. There is a leucine zipper pattern in the protein beginning at amino acid 347.

=== Post-translational modifications ===
==== Acetylation ====
The third amino acid in the protein sequence, serine, is predicted to be acetylated.

==== Phosphorylation ====
There are multiple predicted phosphorylation sites on various serine, tyrosine, and threonine amino acids are predicted for this protein sequence. The conserved DUF3719 domain contains 7 predicted phosphorylation sites.

==== Sumoylation ====
One predicted sumoylation site was identified in the protein sequence at K267.

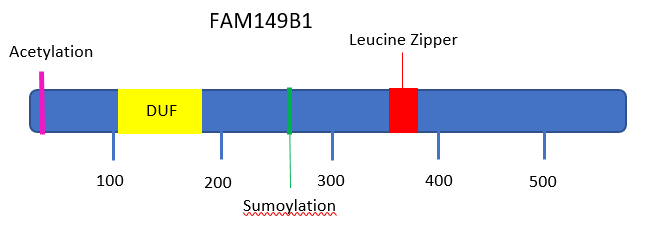
A schematic diagram of the FAM149B1 protein after post translational modifications. The DUF3719 domain is also displayed.

== Expression ==
Overall in the human body, this gene is expressed at levels slightly below the average human gene expression level. The protein is expressed in most cell types of the human body. Most experimentation shows a higher expression of this protein in kidney, testes, and brain tissues, with very low expression seen in pancreas tissues. The gene is expressed at lower levels than its normal expression in most cancerous tissues. The gene is also seen to be expressed most highly in fetal and infantile tissues.

=== DNA microarray data ===
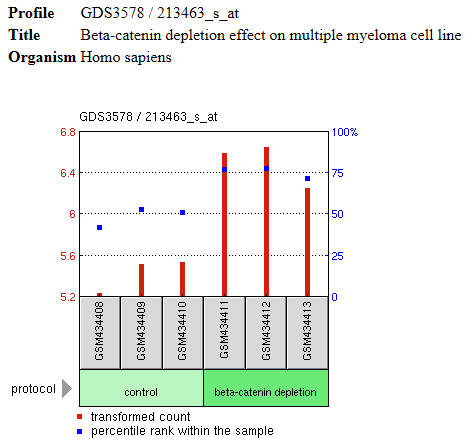
A DNA microarray experiment showing the varying expression levels of FAM149B1 before and after depleting beta-catenin levels in the sample.

DNA microarray analysis experiments show expression patterns of FAM149B1 compared to multiple other genes in a sample. FAM149B1 is shown to be at a lower expression level than most other genes in a multiple myeloma cell line and was shown to increase to close to average gene expression levels after the beta-catenin was depleted from the sample.

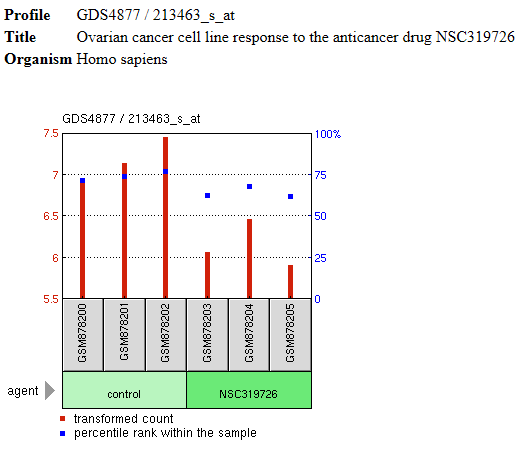
A microarray experiment displaying lowered gene expression levels of FAM149B1 in an ovarian cancer cell line after the use of NSC319726 anticancer drug.

FAM149B1 expression was also shown to decrease to lower than average gene expression levels in an ovarian cancer cell line after the use of an anticancer drug named NSC319726.

== Transcriptional regulation ==
The gene has nine different identified promoter regions, which correlate to the various isoforms of the gene. The promoter for the primary transcript of the gene has binding sites for a variety of different transcription factors.

== Interacting proteins ==
Current data supports the FAM149B1 protein interactions with 6 different proteins.

One protein was determined to be an interacting protein with FAM149B1 through affinity chromatography techniques.

- The TBC1D32 protein has a role in many biological processes including determination of left/right symmetry, embryonic digit morphogenesis, heart development, lens development in camera-type eye, non-motile cilium assembly, protein localization to cilium, retinal pigment epithelium development, and smoothened signaling pathway involved in dorsal/ventral neural tube patterning. This protein is classified as a developmental protein.

The other five proteins that have been predicted to interact with FAM149B1 protein were found through the process of textmining.

- The human ABHD8 (Alpha/Beta Hydrolase Domain-Containing Protein 8) protein is a hydrolase protein found in the extracellular exosome.
  - METTL16 (Methyltransferase 10 Domain Containing) protein is a methyltransferase found in the nucleus and cytosol of the cell. This protein was experimentally determined to interact with YARS protein (tyrosyl-tRNA synthetase), which catalyzes attachment of tyrosine to tRNA, and MEPCE (Methylphosphate Capping Enzyme) which adds a methylphosphate cap at the 5-end of 7SK snRNA.
- SLC6A17 (Solute Carrier Family 6 Member 17) is a sodium-dependent vesicular transporter that is selective for proline, glycine, leucine, and alanine, and is not chloride-dependent as are most other transporters in its family.
- The TM2D1 (Beta-Amyloid-Binding Protein) gene is thought to participate in beta-amyloid-induced apoptosis with its interaction with beta-APP42, and also has G-protein coupled receptor activity. This protein is found mainly in the nucleus and plasma membrane of the cell.
- The DNAJc9 (DnaJ Heat Shock Protein Family (Hsp40) Member C9) protein may play a role as co-chaperone of the Hsp70 family proteins HSPA1A, HSPA1B and HSPA8. This protein is found extracellularly, and in the nucleus, plasma membrane, and cytosol.

== Homology/Evolution ==
=== Paralog ===
There is one known paralog, FAM149A. It is located on the human chromosome 4 at 4q35.1. The function of the protein encoded by this gene is not well understood, but it also contains the DUF3719 protein domain. The protein translated by this gene shares a 21.2% identity with the FAM149B1 protein. The protein sequence is 482 amino acids in length.

=== Orthologs ===
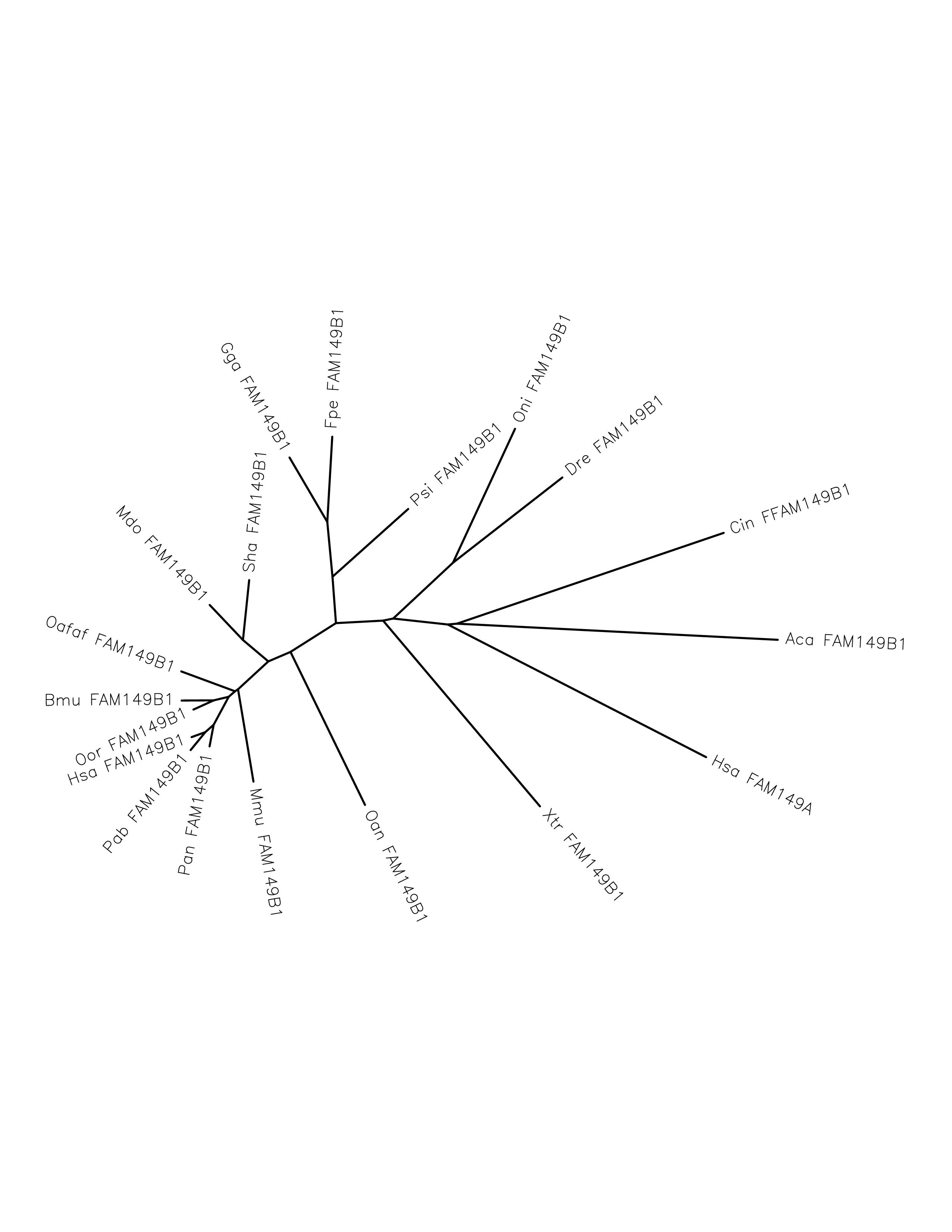
An uprooted phylogenetic tree displaying a select number of orthologues and paralog of the FAM149B1 gene, based on the identity of the species to the human protein sequence.

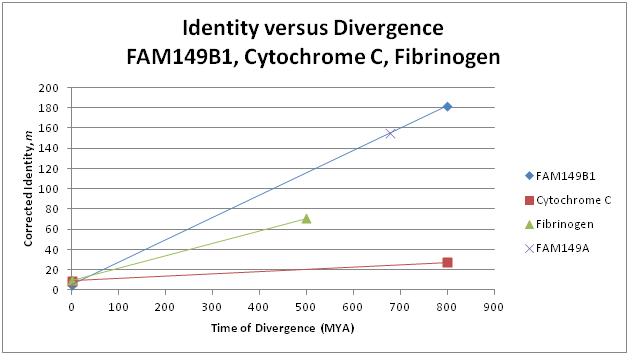
The graph shows the relative rate of genetic modifications compared to fibrinogen and cytochrome c genes across the orthologs of FAM149B1.

This gene has orthologues across mammals, birds, reptiles, fish, and some invertebrates. There is a high conservation in mammals, moderate conservation in many of the other vertebrate orthologues, and a low conservation in its few invertebrate orthologues.

| | Genus species | Common Name | Time of Divergence (MYA) | Accession Number | Length (aa) | Identity |
| 1 | Homo sapiens | Human | - | NP_775483.1 | 582 | 100% |
| 2 | Pongo abelii | Sumatran orangutan | 15.76 | XP_009243761.1 | 587 | 93.0% |
| 3 | Papio anubis | Baboon | 29.4 | XP_003903829.1 | 582 | 93.6% |
| 4 | Mus musculus | Mouse | 90 | XP_006518391.1 | 544 | 73.5% |
| 5 | Bos mutus | Domestic Yak | 96 | XP_005910201.1 | 584 | 86.0% |
| 6 | Orcinus orca | Killer whale, Orca | 96 | XP_004273176.1 | 585 | 87.0% |
| 7 | Ailuropoda melanoleuca | Giant Panda | 96 | XP_011224744.1 | 590 | 82.7% |
| 8 | Orycteropus afer afer | Aardvark | 105 | XP_007938812.1 | 583 | 84.0% |
| 9 | Monodelphis domestica | Short-Tailed Opossum | 159 | XP_007478430.1 | 587 | 73.5% |
| 10 | Sarcophilus harrisii | Tasmanian Devil | 159 | XP_012396086.1 | 588 | 72.0% |
| 11 | Ornithorhynchus anatinus | Platypus | 177 | XP_007658720.1 | 506 | 48.1% |
| 12 | Gallus gallus | Chicken | 312 | XP_004942035.1 | 602 | 50.4% |
| 13 | Lepidothrix coronata | Blue-crowned manakin | 312 | XP_017688171.1 | 576 | 47.5% |
| 14 | Haliaeetus albicilla | White-tailed eagle | 312 | XP_009911204.1 | 589 | 49.4% |
| 15 | Falco peregrinus | Peregrine falcon | 312 | XP_005235226.1 | 597 | 49.2% |
| 16 | Chrysemys picta bellii | Western painted turtle | 312 | XP_008169104.1 | 596 | 56.1% |
| 17 | Pelodiscus sinensis | Chinese softshell turtle | 312 | XP_014433498.1 | 487 | 47.1% |
| 18 | Alligator mississippiensis | American alligator | 312 | XP_014464842.1 | 596 | 55.0% |
| 19 | Xenopus tropicalis | Western clawed frog | 352 | NP_001278638.1 | 561 | 39.8% |
| 20 | Danio rerio | Zebra fish | 435 | NP_001074134.1 | 644 | 37.7% |
| 21 | Lepisosteus oculatus | Spotted gar | 435 | XP_015202055.1 | 647 | 37.9% |
| 22 | Oreochromis niloticus | Nile tilapia | 435 | XP_005474333.1 | 683 | 34.3% |
| 23 | Callorhinchus milii | Australian ghostshark | 473 | XP_007897395.1 | 638 | 36.8% |
| 24 | Ciona intestinalis | Sea squirt | 676 | XP_002129894.1 | 807 | 24.5% |
| 25 | Aplysia californica | California sea slug | 797 | XP_012945921.1 | 312 | 16.9% |

== Clinical significance ==
While the gene is largely not well understood by scientists, it is shown to be associated with a wide range of various cancerous tumors.

The FAM149B1 gene is also included in a region of 11 genes that comprises one of 15 regions containing mutations associated with the African Pygmy phenotype.
