= Tyrosine–tRNA ligase =

Class of enzymes

Identifiers
- EC no.: 6.1.1.1
- CAS no.: 9023-45-4

Databases
- BRENDA: enzyme data
- ExPASy: NiceZyme view
- KEGG: enzyme entry
- MetaCyc: metabolic pathway
- Rhea: reactions
- PDB structures: RCSB PDB PDBe PDBsum
- Gene Ontology: AmiGO / QuickGO
Search
- PMC: articles
- PubMed: articles
- NCBI: proteins

Tyrosine–tRNA ligase (EC 6.1.1.1), also known as tyrosyl-tRNA synthetase, is an enzyme that in humans is encoded by the genes YARS1 and YARS2. Tyrosine–tRNA ligase catalyzes the chemical reaction

ATP + L-tyrosine + tRNA^{Tyr} $\rightleftharpoons$ AMP + diphosphate + L-tyrosyl-tRNA^{Tyr}

The three substrates of this enzyme are ATP, L-tyrosine, and a tyrosine-specific transfer RNA tRNA^{Tyr}, whereas its three products are AMP, diphosphate, and L-tyrosyl-tRNA^{Tyr}.

This enzyme belongs to the family of ligases, to be specific those forming carbon-oxygen bonds in tRNA and related compounds. More specifically, it belongs to the family of the aminoacyl-tRNA synthetases. These latter enzymes link amino acids to their cognate transfer RNAs (tRNA) in aminoacylation reactions that establish the connection between a specific amino acid and a nucleotide triplet anticodon embedded in the tRNA. Therefore, they are the enzymes that translate the genetic code in vivo. The 20 enzymes, corresponding to the 20 natural amino acids, are divided into two classes of 10 enzymes each. This division is defined by the unique architectures associated with the catalytic domains and by signature sequences specific to each class.

== Structural studies ==
As of late 2007, 34 structures have been solved for this class of enzymes, with PDB accession codes

The tyrosyl-tRNA synthetases (YARS) are either homodimers or monomers with a pseudo-dimeric structure. Each subunit or pseudo-subunit comprises an N-terminal domain which has: (i) about 230 amino acid residues; (ii) the mononucleotide binding fold (also known as Rossmann fold) of the class I aminoacyl-tRNA synthetases; (iii) an idiosynchratic insertion between the two halves of the fold (known as Connective Peptide 1 or CP1); (iv) the two signature sequences HIGH and KMSKS of the class I aminoacyl-tRNA synthetases. The N-terminal domain contains the catalytic site of the enzyme. The C-terminal moiety of the YARSs varies in sequence, length and organization and is involved in the recognition of the tRNA anticodon.

=== Eubacteria ===
Tyrosyl-tRNA synthetase from Bacillus stearothermophilus was the first synthetase whose crystal structure has been solved at high resolution (2.3 Å), alone or in complex with tyrosine, tyrosyl-adenylate or tyrosinyl-adenylate.(P. Brick 1989) The structures of the Staphylococcus aureus YARS and of a truncated version of Escherichia coli YARS have also been solved. A structural model of the complex between B. sterothermophilus YARS and tRNA^{Tyr} was constructed using extensive mutagenesis data on both YARS and tRNA^{Tyr} and found consistent with the crystal structure of the complex between YARS and tRNA^{Tyr} from Thermus thermophilus, which was subsequently solved at 2.9 Å resolution.

The C-terminal moiety of the eubacterial YARSs comprises two domains: (i) a proximal α-helical domain (known as Anticodon Binding Domain or α-ACB) of about 100 amino acids; (ii) a distal domain (known as S4-like) that shares high homology with the C-terminal domain of ribosomal protein S4. The S4-like domain was disordered in the crystal structure of B. stearothermophilus YARS. However, biochemical and NMR experiments have shown that the S4-like domain is folded in solution, and that its structure is similar to that in the crystal structure of the T. thermophilus YARS. Mutagenesis experiments have shown that the flexibility of the peptide that links the α-ACB and S4-like domains is responsible for the disorder of the latter in the structure and that elements of sequence in this linker peptide are essential for the binding of tRNA^{Tyr} by YARS and its aminoacylation with tyrosine. TyrRSs from eubacterial species are divided into two subgroups according to variation in their C-terminal moiety.

=== Archaea and lower eukaryotes ===
The crystal structures of several archaeal tyrosyl-tRNA synthetases are available. The crystal structure of the complex between YARS from Methanococcus jannaschii, tRNA^{Tyr} and L-tyrosine has been solved at 1.95 Å resolution. The crystal structures of the YARSs from Archeoglobus fulgidus, Pyrococcus horikoshii and Aeropyrum pernix have also been solved at high resolution.(M. Kuratani 2006) The C-terminal moieties of the archaeal YARSs contain only one domain. This domain is different from the α-ACB domain of eubacteria; it shares strong homology with the C-terminal domain of the tryptophanyl-tRNA synthetases and was therefore named C-W/Y domain. It is present in all eukarya. The structure of the complex between YARS from Saccharomyces cerevisiae, tRNA^{Tyr} and an analog of tysosyl-adenylate has been solved at 2.4 Å resolution. The YARS from this lower eukaryote has an organization which is similar to that of the archaeal YARSs.

=== Homo sapiens cytoplasm ===
The human YARS has a C-terminal moiety that include a proximal C-W/Y domain and a distal domain which is not found in the YARSs of lower eukaryotes, archaea or eubacteria, and is a homolog of endothelial monocyte-activating polypeptide II (EMAP II, a mammalian cytokine). Although full-length, native YARS has no cell-signaling activity, the enzyme is secreted during apoptosis in cell culture and can be cleaved with an extracellular enzyme such as leukocyte elastase. The two released fragments, an N-terminal mini-YARS and a C-terminal EMAP II-like C-terminal domain, are active cytokines. The structure of mini-YARS has been solved at 1.18 Å resolution. It has an N-terminal Rossmann-fold domain and a C-terminal C-W/Y domain, similar to those of other YARSs.

=== Homo sapiens mitochondria ===
The mitochondrial tyrosyl-tRNA synthetases (mt-YARSs) and in particular H. sapiens mt-YARS, likely originate from a YARS of eubacterial origin. Their C-terminal moiety includes both α-ACB and S4-like domains like the eubacterial YARSs and share a low sequence identity with their cytosolic relatives. The crystal structure of a complex between a recombinant H. sapiens mt-YARS, devoid of the S4-like domain, and an analog of tyrosyl-adenylate has been solved at 2.2 Å resolution.

=== Neurospora crassa mitochondria ===
The mitochondrial (mt) tyrosyl-tRNA synthetase of Neurospora crassa, which is encoded by the nuclear gene cyt-18, is a bifunctional enzyme that catalyzes the aminoacylation of mt-tRNA^{Tyr} and promotes the splicing of the mitochondrial group I introns. The crystal structure of a C-terminally truncated N. crassa mt-YARS that functions in splicing group I introns, has been determined at 1.95 Å resolution. Its Rossmann-fold domain and intermediate α-ACB domain superimpose on those of eubacterial YARSs, except for an additional N-terminal extension and three small insertions. The structure of the complex between a group I intron ribozyme and the splicing-active, carboxy-terminally truncated mt-YARS has been solved at 4.5 Å resolution. The structure shows that the group I intron binds across the two subunits of the homodimeric protein with a newly evolved RNA-binding surface distinct from that which binds tRNA^{Tyr}. This RNA binding surface provides an extended scaffold for the phosphodiester backbone of the conserved catalytic core of the intron RNA, allowing the protein to promote the splicing of a wide variety of group I introns. The group I intron-binding surface includes three small insertions and additional structural adaptations relative to non-splicing eubacterial YARSs, indicating a multistep adaptation for splicing function.

=== Plasmodium falciparum ===
The structure of the complex between Plasmodium falciparum tyrosyl-tRNA synthetase (Pf-YARS) and tyrosyl-adenylate at 2.2 Å resolution, shows that the overall fold of Pf-YARS is typical of class I synthetases. It comprises an N-terminal catalytic domain (residues 18–260) and an anticodon-binding domain (residues 261–370). The polypeptide loop that includes the KMSKS motif, is highly ordered and close to the bound substrate at the active site. Pf-YARS contains the ELR motif, which is present in H. sapiens mini-YARS and chemokines. Pf-YARS is expressed in all asexual parasite stages (rings, trophozoites and schizonts) and is exported to the host erythrocyte cytosol, from where it is released into blood plasma on iRBC rupture. Using its ELR peptide motif, Pf-YARS specifically binds to and internalizes into host macrophages, leading to enhanced secretion of the pro-inflammatory cytokines TnF-α and IL-6. The interaction between Pf-YARS and macrophages augments expression of adherence-linked host endothelial receptors ICAm-1 and VCAm-1.

=== Mimivirus ===
Acanthamoeba polyphaga mimivirus is the largest known DNA virus. It genome encodes four aminoacyl-tRNA synthetases: RARS, CARS, MARS, and YARS. The crystal structure of the mimivirus tyrosyl-tRNA synthetase in complex with tyrosinol has been solved at 2.2 Å resolution. The mimiviral YARS exhibits the typical fold and active-site organization of archaeal-type YARSs, with an N-terminal Rossmann-fold catalytic domain, an anticodon binding domain, and no extra C-terminal domain. It presents a unique dimeric conformation and significant differences in its anticodon binding site, when compared with the YARSs from other organisms.

=== Leishmania major ===
The single YARS gene that is present in the genomes of trypanosomatids, codes for a protein that has twice the length of tyrosyl-tRBA synthetase from other organisms. Each half of the double-length YARS contains a catalytic domain and an anticodon-binding domain; however, the two halves retain only 17% sequence identity to each other. Crystal structures of Leishmania major YARS at 3.0 Å resolution show that the two halves of a single molecule form a pseudo-dimer that resembles the canonical YARS dimer. The C-terminal copy of the catalytic domain has lost the catalytically important HIGH and KMSKS motifs, characteristic of class I aminoacyl-tRNA synthetases. Thus, the pseudo-dimer contains only one functional active site (contributed by the N-terminal half) and only one functional anticodon recognition site (contributed by the C-terminal half). Thus, the L. major YARS pseudo-dimer is inherently asymmetric.

== Roles of the subunits and domains ==
The N-terminal domain of tyrosyl-tRNA synthetase provides the chemical groups necessary for converting the substrates tyrosine and ATP into a reactive intermediate, tyrosyl-adenylate (the first step of the aminoacylation reaction) and for transferring the amino-acid moiety from tyrosyl-adenylate to the 3'OH-CCA terminus of the cognate tRNA^{Tyr} (the second step of the aminoacylation reaction). The other domains are responsible (i) for the recognition of the anticodon bases of the cognate tRNA^{Tyr}; (ii) for the binding of the long variable arm of tRNA^{Tyr} in eubacteria; and (iii) for unrelated functions such as cytokine activity.

=== Recognition of tRNA^{Tyr} ===
The tRNA^{Tyr} molecule has an L-shaped structure. Its recognition involves both subunits of the tyrosyl-tRNA synthetase dimer. The acceptor arm of tRNA^{Tyr} interacts with the catalytic domain of one YARS monomer whereas the anticodon arm interacts with the C-terminal moiety of the other monomer. In most YARS structures, the monomers are related to each other by a twofold rotational symmetry. Moreover, all available crystal structures of complexes between YARS and tRNA^{Tyr} are also planar, with symmetrical conformations of the two monomers in the dimer and with two tRNA^{Tyr} molecules simultaneously interacting with one YARS dimer. However, kinetic studies of tyrosine activation and tRNA^{Tyr} charging have revealed an anticooperative behavior of the TyrRS dimer in solution: each TyrRS dimer binds and tyrosylates only one tRNA^{Tyr} molecule at a time. Thus, only one of the two sites is active at any given time.

The presence of base pair Gua1:Cyt72 in the acceptor stem of tRNA^{Tyr} from eubacteria and of base pair Cyt1-Gua72 in tRNA^{Tyr} from archaea and eukaryotes results in a species specific recognition of tRNA^{Tyr} by tyrosyl-tRNA synthetase. This characteristic of the recognition between YARS and tRNA^{Tyr} has been used to obtain aminoacyl-tRNA synthetases that can specifically charge non-sense suppressor derivatives of tRNA^{Tyr} with unnatural aminoacids in vivo without interfering with the normal process of translation in the cell.

Both tyrosyl-tRNA synthetases and tryptophanyl-tRNA synthetases belong to Class I of the aminoacyl-tRNA synthetases, both are dimers and both have a class II mode of tRNA recognition, i.e. they interact with their cognate tRNAs from the variable loop and major groove side of the acceptor stem. This is in strong contrast to the other class I enzymes, which are monomeric and approach their cognate tRNA from minor groove side of the acceptor stem.

=== Folding and stability ===
The unfolding reaction and stability of tyrosyl-tRNA synthetase from Bacillus stearothermophilus have been studied under equilibrium conditions. This homodimeric enzyme is highly stable with a variation of free energy upon unfolding equal to 41 ± 1 kcal/mol. It unfolds through a compact monomeric intermediate. About one-third of the global energy of stabilization comes from the association between the two subunits, and one-third come from the secondary and tertiary interactions stabilizing each of the two molecules of the monomeric intermediate. Both mutations within the dimer interface and mutations distal to the interface can destabilize the association between the subunits. These experiments have shown in particular that the monomer of YARS is enzymatically inactive.
