= Tyrosine–tRNA ligase, cytoplasmic =

Enzyme found in humans

YARS1
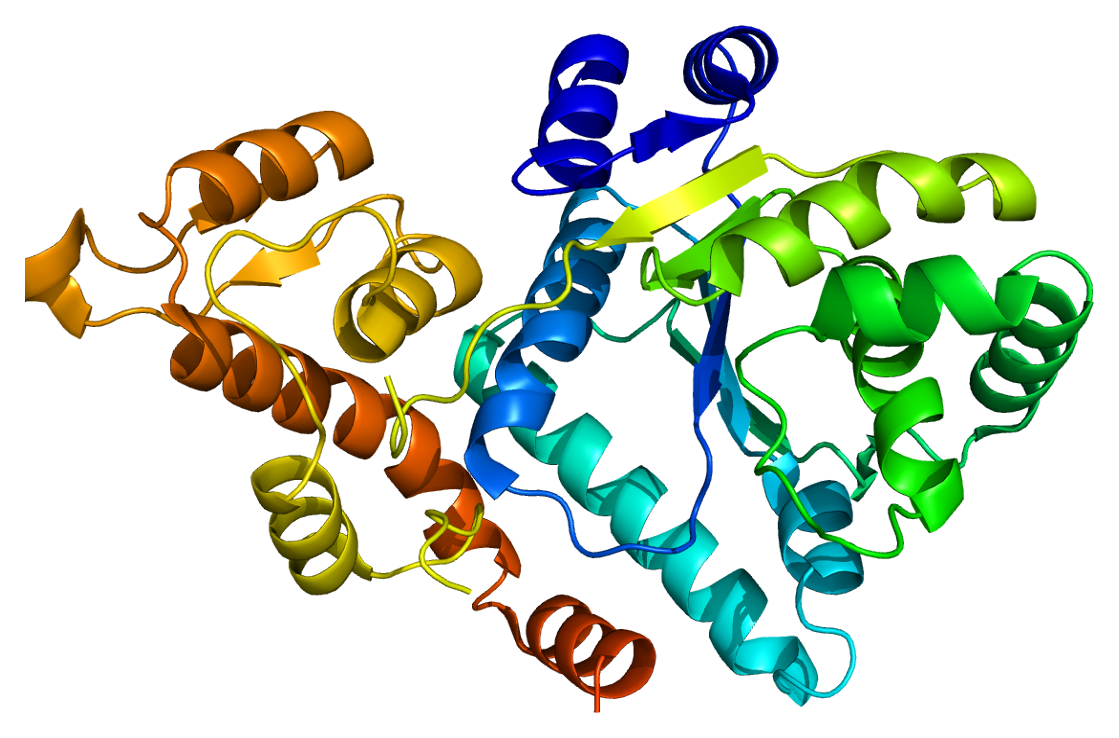

Identifiers
- Aliases: YARS1, CMTDIC, TYRRS, YRS, YTS, tyrosyl-tRNA synthetase, tyrosyl-tRNA synthetase 1, YARS, IMNEPD2
- External IDs: OMIM: 603623; MGI: 2147627; GeneCards: YARS1
Available structures
| PDB | Ortholog search: PDBe RCSB |
| PDB | List of PDB id codes 1N3L, 1NTG, 1Q11, 4Q93, 4QBT |
Enzyme activity
| EC # | BRENDA | ExPASy | KEGG | MetaCyc |
|---|---|---|---|---|
| 6.1.1.1 | ↗ | ↗ | ↗ | ↗ |

Gene location (Human)
| Chr. | Chromosome 1 (human) |
| Band | 1p35.1 | Start | 32,775,237 bp |
| Band | 1p35.1 | End | 32,818,031 bp |

Gene location (Mouse)
| Chr. | Chromosome 4 (mouse) |
| Band | 4|4 D2.2 | Start | 129,083,553 bp |
| Band | 4|4 D2.2 | End | 129,113,400 bp |
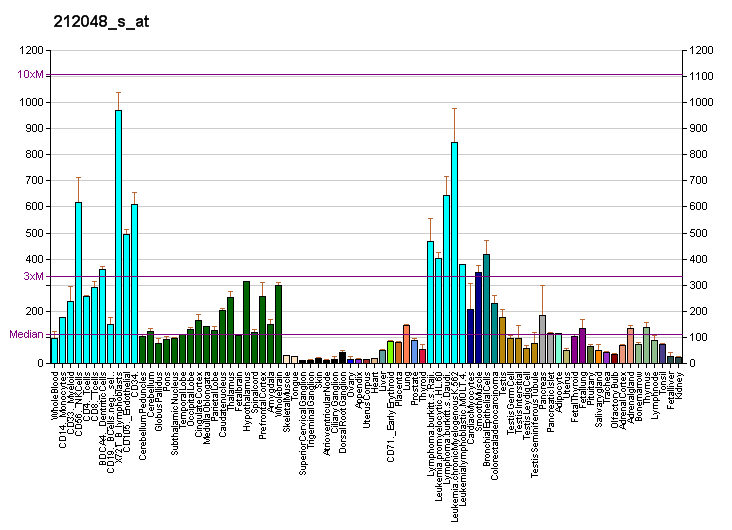
RNA expression pattern
| Bgee | Human / Mouse (ortholog); Top expressed in: right adrenal gland; islet of Langerhans; left adrenal gland; right adrenal cortex; prefrontal cortex; endothelial cell; left adrenal cortex; right frontal lobe; stromal cell of endometrium; gingival epithelium / Top expressed in: yolk sac; dentate gyrus of hippocampal formation granule cell; neural layer of retina; superior frontal gyrus; primary visual cortex; ventricular zone; morula; morula; neural tube; muscle of thigh; More reference expression data |
| BioGPS | More reference expression data |
Gene ontology
| Molecular function | aminoacyl-tRNA ligase activity; nucleotide binding; signal transducer activity; ligase activity; protein binding; interleukin-8 receptor binding; ATP binding; tyrosine-tRNA ligase activity; tRNA binding; RNA binding |
| Cellular component | extracellular space; cytoplasm; nuclear body; cytosol; aminoacyl-tRNA synthetase multienzyme complex; methionyl glutamyl tRNA synthetase complex |
| Biological process | tyrosyl-tRNA aminoacylation; protein biosynthesis; apoptotic process; signal transduction; tRNA aminoacylation for protein translation |
Sources:Amigo / QuickGO
Orthologs
| Databases | NCBI: entry; OMA: entry |
| Species | Human | Mouse |
| Entrez | 8565 | 107271 |
| Ensembl | ENSG00000134684 | ENSMUSG00000028811 |
| UniProt | P54577 | Q91WQ3 |
| RefSeq (mRNA) | NM_003680 | NM_134151 |
| RefSeq (protein) | NP_003671 | NP_598912 |
| Location (UCSC) | Chr 1: 32.78 – 32.82 Mb | Chr 4: 129.08 – 129.11 Mb |
| PubMed search |
- Wikidata
| View/Edit Human | View/Edit Mouse |

Tyrosine–tRNA ligase, cytoplasmic, also called Tyrosyl-tRNA synthetase 1, is an enzyme that in humans is encoded by the YARS1 gene (previously YARS). Like the mitochondrial variety, YARS2, this enzyme functions as a Tyrosine–tRNA ligase, meaning it functions to attach the amino acid tyrosine to its corresponding transfer RNA (tRNA^{Tyr}) as part of RNA-to-protein translation.

== Function ==
Living cells translate DNA sequences into RNA sequences and then into protein sequences. Proteins are chains of amino acids, such as tyrosine. As the protein grows, each amino acid is added to the end with the help of an adapter molecule called transfer RNA (tRNA). Each amino acid has its own tRNA (called tRNA^{Tyr} in the case of tyrosine), and tyrosyl-tRNA synthetase is an enzyme that attaches tyrosine to tRNA^{Tyr}, so that it can be then used in this translation process.

Aminoacyl-tRNA synthetases catalyze the aminoacylation of transfer RNA (tRNA) by their cognate amino acid. Because of their central role in linking amino acids with nucleotide triplets contained in tRNAs, aminoacyl-tRNA synthetases are thought to be among the first proteins that appeared in evolution. Tyrosyl-tRNA synthetase belongs to the class I tRNA synthetase family. Cytokine activities have also been observed for the human tyrosyl-tRNA synthetase, after it is split into two parts, an N-terminal fragment that harbors the catalytic site and a C-terminal fragment found only in the mammalian enzyme. The N-terminal fragment is an interleukin-8-like cytokine, whereas the released C-terminal fragment is an EMAP II-like cytokine.

== Medical significance ==
Pathogenic (heterozygous) variants in YARS1 have been associated with peripheral nervous system dysfunction called type C dominant intermediate Charcot-Marie-Tooth neuropathy (CMTDIC).
