= Tyrosine–tRNA ligase, mitochondrial =

Enzyme found in humans

YARS2

Identifiers
- Aliases: YARS2, MLASA2, MT-TYRRS, TYRRS, CGI-04, tyrosyl-tRNA synthetase 2
- External IDs: OMIM: 610957; MGI: 1917370; GeneCards: YARS2
Available structures
PDB	Ortholog search: PDBe RCSB
PDB	List of PDB id codes 2PID, 3ZXI
Enzyme activity
EC #	BRENDA	ExPASy	KEGG	MetaCyc
6.1.1.1	↗	↗	↗	↗

Gene location (Human)
Chr.	Chromosome 12 (human)
Band	12p11.21	Start	32,727,490 bp
Band	12p11.21	End	32,755,897 bp

Gene location (Mouse)
Chr.	Chromosome 16 (mouse)
Band	16|16 A2	Start	16,120,829 bp
Band	16|16 A2	End	16,127,504 bp
RNA expression pattern
Bgee	Human / Mouse (ortholog); Top expressed in: oocyte; secondary oocyte; endothelial cell; gonad; mucosa of transverse colon; ventricular zone; endometrium; gingival epithelium; right adrenal cortex; stromal cell of endometrium / Top expressed in: epiblast; embryo; embryo; right kidney; proximal tubule; hand; muscle of thigh; endocardial cushion; migratory enteric neural crest cell; tail of embryo; More reference expression data
BioGPS	n/a
Gene ontology
Molecular function	aminoacyl-tRNA ligase activity; tRNA binding; nucleotide binding; tyrosine binding; ligase activity; protein binding; ATP binding; protein homodimerization activity; tyrosine-tRNA ligase activity; RNA binding
Cellular component	cytoplasm; cytosol; mitochondrial matrix; mitochondrion; nuclear body
Biological process	tyrosyl-tRNA aminoacylation; tRNA aminoacylation; tRNA aminoacylation for protein translation; protein biosynthesis; mitochondrial tyrosyl-tRNA aminoacylation
Sources:Amigo / QuickGO
Orthologs
Databases	NCBI: entry; OMA: entry
Species	Human	Mouse
Entrez	51067	70120
Ensembl	ENSG00000139131	ENSMUSG00000022792
UniProt	Q9Y2Z4	Q8BYL4
RefSeq (mRNA)	NM_001040436; NM_015936	NM_198246
RefSeq (protein)	NP_001035526	NP_937889
Location (UCSC)	Chr 12: 32.73 – 32.76 Mb	Chr 16: 16.12 – 16.13 Mb
PubMed search
- Wikidata
View/Edit Human	View/Edit Mouse

Tyrosine–tRNA ligase, mitochondrial, also known as tyrosyl-tRNA synthetase 2, is an enzyme that in humans is encoded by the YARS2 gene. This enzyme is an aminoacyl tRNA synthetase which functions to attach the amino acid tyrosine to its corresponding transfer RNA (tRNA^{Tyr}) as part of RNA-to-protein translation. It is part of the class-I aminoacyl-tRNA synthetase family.

== Medical significance ==
Pathogenic mutations in YARS2 are associated with mitochondrial dysfunction whose severity varies from individual to individual. Some of those affected have heart and cardiovascular issues from infancy, and die young, while others instead experience sideroblastic anemia and mild muscle weakness in early adulthood. This syndrome is called myopathy, lactic acidosis, and sideroblastic anemia-2 (MLASA2), and appears to follow an autosomal dominant inheritance pattern. Unlike mutations in many other mitochondrial aminoacyl-tRNA synthetases, it rarely affects the brain and spinal cord.

== See also ==
- Tyrosine–tRNA ligase, cytoplasmic
