= DNA damage-inducible transcript 3 =

Human protein and coding gene

DDIT3

Identifiers
- Aliases: DDIT3, CEBPZ, CHOP, CHOP-10, CHOP10, GADD153, DNA damage-inducible transcript 3, DNA damage inducible transcript 3, C/EBPzeta, AltDDIT3
- External IDs: OMIM: 126337; MGI: 109247; GeneCards: DDIT3

Gene location (Human)
Chr.	Chromosome 12 (human)
Band	12q13.3	Start	57,516,588 bp
Band	12q13.3	End	57,521,737 bp

Gene location (Mouse)
Chr.	Chromosome 10 (mouse)
Band	10|10 D3	Start	127,126,643 bp
Band	10|10 D3	End	127,132,157 bp
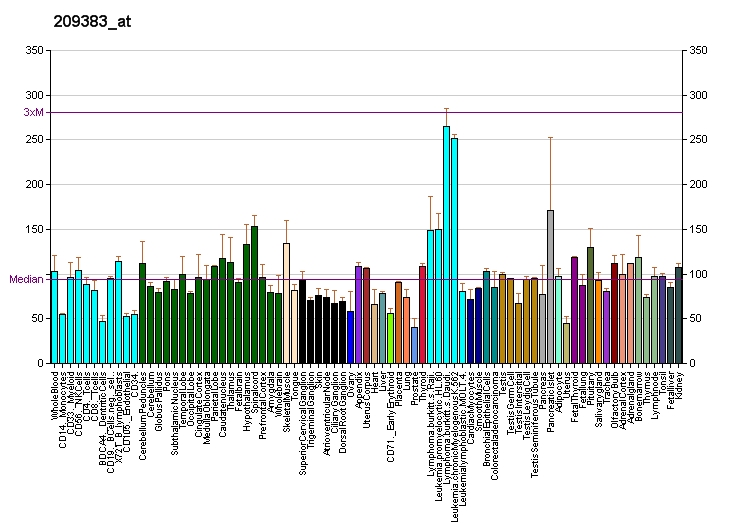
RNA expression pattern
Bgee	Human / Mouse (ortholog); Top expressed in: anterior pituitary; left lobe of thyroid gland; substantia nigra; gastric mucosa; hypothalamus; right lobe of thyroid gland; putamen; C1 segment; caudate nucleus; right lobe of liver / Top expressed in: granulocyte; neural layer of retina; calvaria; motor neuron; supraoptic nucleus; islet of Langerhans; seminiferous tubule; dentate gyrus of hippocampal formation granule cell; ankle joint; superior frontal gyrus; More reference expression data
BioGPS	More reference expression data
Gene ontology
Molecular function	DNA binding; cAMP response element binding protein binding; transcription corepressor activity; DNA-binding transcription factor activity; DNA-binding transcription activator activity, RNA polymerase II-specific; transcription factor binding; transcription cis-regulatory region binding; RNA polymerase II cis-regulatory region sequence-specific DNA binding; leucine zipper domain binding; protein binding; protein heterodimerization activity; protein homodimerization activity; DNA-binding transcription factor activity, RNA polymerase II-specific
Cellular component	cytoplasm; cytosol; late endosome; CHOP-C/EBP complex; nucleoplasm; transcription factor AP-1 complex; protein-DNA complex; CHOP-ATF4 complex; CHOP-ATF3 complex; nucleus
Biological process	apoptotic process; release of sequestered calcium ion into cytosol; negative regulation of protein kinase B signaling; negative regulation of fat cell differentiation; negative regulation of myoblast differentiation; regulation of transcription, DNA-templated; positive regulation of endoplasmic reticulum stress-induced intrinsic apoptotic signaling pathway; positive regulation of transcription from RNA polymerase II promoter in response to endoplasmic reticulum stress; negative regulation of DNA binding; mRNA transcription by RNA polymerase II; positive regulation of neuron death; negative regulation of transcription by RNA polymerase II; Wnt signaling pathway; cell redox homeostasis; response to endoplasmic reticulum stress; PERK-mediated unfolded protein response; ER overload response; cellular response to DNA damage stimulus; transcription, DNA-templated; positive regulation of transcription, DNA-templated; ATF6-mediated unfolded protein response; positive regulation of neuron apoptotic process; response to unfolded protein; intrinsic apoptotic signaling pathway in response to endoplasmic reticulum stress; negative regulation of RNA polymerase II regulatory region sequence-specific DNA binding; positive regulation of interleukin-8 production; response to starvation; negative regulation of determination of dorsal identity; cell cycle; regulation of DNA-templated transcription in response to stress; negative regulation of transcription, DNA-templated; negative regulation of canonical Wnt signaling pathway; positive regulation of transcription by RNA polymerase II; proteasome-mediated ubiquitin-dependent protein catabolic process; blood vessel maturation; negative regulation of CREB transcription factor activity; endoplasmic reticulum unfolded protein response; establishment of protein localization to mitochondrion; intrinsic apoptotic signaling pathway in response to nitrosative stress; negative regulation of DNA-binding transcription factor activity; positive regulation of DNA-binding transcription factor activity; protein complex oligomerization; negative regulation of cold-induced thermogenesis; regulation of autophagy; positive regulation of intrinsic apoptotic signaling pathway
Sources:Amigo / QuickGO
Orthologs
Databases	NCBI: entry; OMA: entry
Species	Human	Mouse
Entrez	1649	13198
Ensembl	ENSG00000175197	ENSMUSG00000025408
UniProt	P35638	P35639
RefSeq (mRNA)	NM_001195053; NM_001195054; NM_001195055; NM_001195056; NM_001195057 NM_004083	NM_001290183; NM_007837
RefSeq (protein)	NP_001181982; NP_001181983; NP_001181984; NP_001181985; NP_001181986 NP_004074	NP_001277112; NP_031863
Location (UCSC)	Chr 12: 57.52 – 57.52 Mb	Chr 10: 127.13 – 127.13 Mb
PubMed search
- Wikidata
View/Edit Human	View/Edit Mouse

DNA damage-inducible transcript 3, also known as C/EBP homologous protein (CHOP), is a pro-apoptotic transcription factor that is encoded by the DDIT3 gene. It is a member of the CCAAT/enhancer-binding protein (C/EBP) family of DNA-binding transcription factors. The protein functions as a dominant-negative inhibitor by forming heterodimers with other C/EBP members, preventing their DNA binding activity. The protein is implicated in adipogenesis and erythropoiesis and has an important role in the cell's stress response.

== Structure ==
C/EBP proteins are known to have a conserved C-terminal structure, basic leucine zipper domain(bZIP), that is necessary for the formation of DNA-binding capable homodimers or heterodimers with other proteins or members of the C/EBP protein family. CHOP is a relatively small (29kDa) protein that differs from most C/EBP proteins in several amino acid substitutions, which impacts its DNA-binding ability.

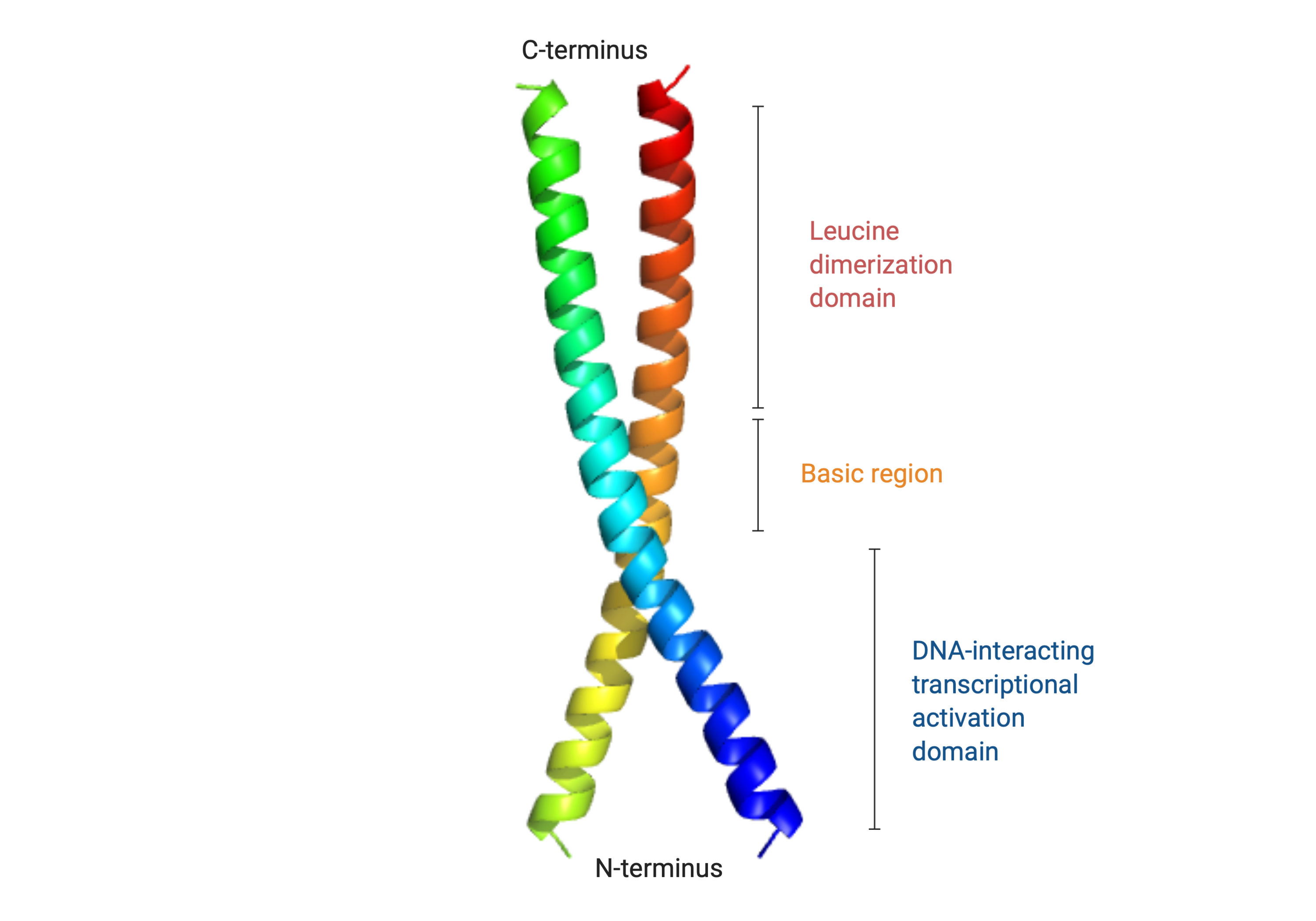
CHOP protein structure created with PyMOL

== Regulation and function ==
Due to a variety of upstream and downstream regulatory interactions, CHOP plays an important role in ER stress-induced apoptosis caused by a variety of stimuli such as pathogenic microbial or viral infections, amino acid starvation, mitochondrial stress, neurological diseases, and neoplastic diseases.

Under normal physiological conditions, CHOP is ubiquitously present at very low levels. However, under overwhelming ER stress conditions, the expression of CHOP rises sharply along with the activation of apoptotic pathways in a wide variety of cells. Those processes are mainly regulated by three factors: protein kinase RNA-like endoplasmic reticulum kinase (PERK), activating transcription factor 6 (ATF6), and inositol requiring protein 1 (IRE1α)

=== Upstream regulatory pathways ===
During ER stress, CHOP is mainly induced via activation of the integrated stress response pathways through the subsequent downstream phosphorylation of a translation initiation factor, eukaryotic initiation factor 2α (eIF2α), and induction of a transcription factor, activation transcription factor 4 (ATF4), which converges on the promoters of target genes, including CHOP.

Integrated stress response, and thus CHOP expression, can be induced by

- amino acid starvation through general control non-derepressible-2 (GCN2)
- viral infection through the vertebrate-specific kinases - double-stranded RNA-activated protein kinase (PKR)
- iron deficiency through heme-regulated inhibitor kinase (HRI)
- stress from the accumulation of unfolded or misfolded proteins in the ER activates the integrated stress response through protein kinase RNA-like endoplasmic reticulum kinase (PERK).

Under ER stress, activated transmembrane protein ATF6 translocates to the nucleus and interacts with ATF/cAMP response elements and ER stress-response elements, binding the promoters and inducing transcription of several genes involved in unfolded protein response (including CHOP, XBP1 and others). Thus, ATF6 activates the transcription of both CHOP and XBP-1, while XBP-1 can also upregulate the expression of CHOP.

ER stress also stimulates transmembrane protein IRE1α activity. Upon activation, IRE1α splices the XBP-1 mRNA introns to produce a mature and active XBP-1 protein, that upregulates CHOP expression IRE1α also stimulates the activation of the apoptotic-signaling kinase-1 (ASK1), which then activates the downstream kinases, Jun-N-terminal kinase (JNK) and p38 mitogen-activated protein kinase (p38 MAPK), which participate in apoptosis induction along with CHOP. The P38 MAP kinase family phosphorylates Ser78 and Ser81 of CHOP, which induces cell apoptosis. Moreover, research studies found that the JNK inhibitors can suppress CHOP upregulation, indicating that JNK activation is also involved in the modulation of CHOP levels.

=== Downstream apoptotic pathways ===
==== Mitochondria-dependent ====
As a transcription factor, CHOP can regulate the expression of many anti-apoptotic and pro-apoptotic genes, including genes encoding the BCL2-family proteins, GADD34 and TRB-3. In the CHOP-induced apoptotic pathway, CHOP regulates the expression of BCL2 protein family, that includes anti-apoptotic proteins (BCL2, BCL-XL, MCL-1, and BCL-W) and pro-apoptotic proteins (BAK, BAX, BOK, BIM, PUMA and others).

Under ER stress, CHOP can function as either a transcriptional activator or repressor. It forms heterodimers with other C/EBP family transcription factors via bZIP-domain interactions to inhibit the expression of genes responsive to C/EBP family transcription factors, while enhancing the expression of other genes containing a specific 12–14 bp DNA cis-acting element. CHOP can downregulate the expressions of anti-apoptotic BCL2 proteins, and upregulate the expression of proapoptotic proteins (BIM, BAK and BAX expression). BAX-BAK oligomerization causes cytochrome c and apoptosis-inducing factor (AIF) release from mitochondria, eventually causing cell death.

TRB3 pseudokinase is upregulated by the ER stress-inducible transcriptional factor, ATF4-CHOP. CHOP interacts with TRB3, which contributes to the induction of apoptosis. The expression of TRB3 has a pro-apoptotic capacity. Therefore, CHOP also regulates apoptosis by upregulating the expression of the TRB3 gene.

==== Death-receptor dependent ====
Death receptor-mediated apoptosis occurs via activation of death ligands (Fas, TNF, and TRAIL) and death receptors. Upon activation, the receptor protein, Fas-associated death domain protein, forms a death-inducing signaling complex, which activates the downstream caspase cascade to induce apoptosis.

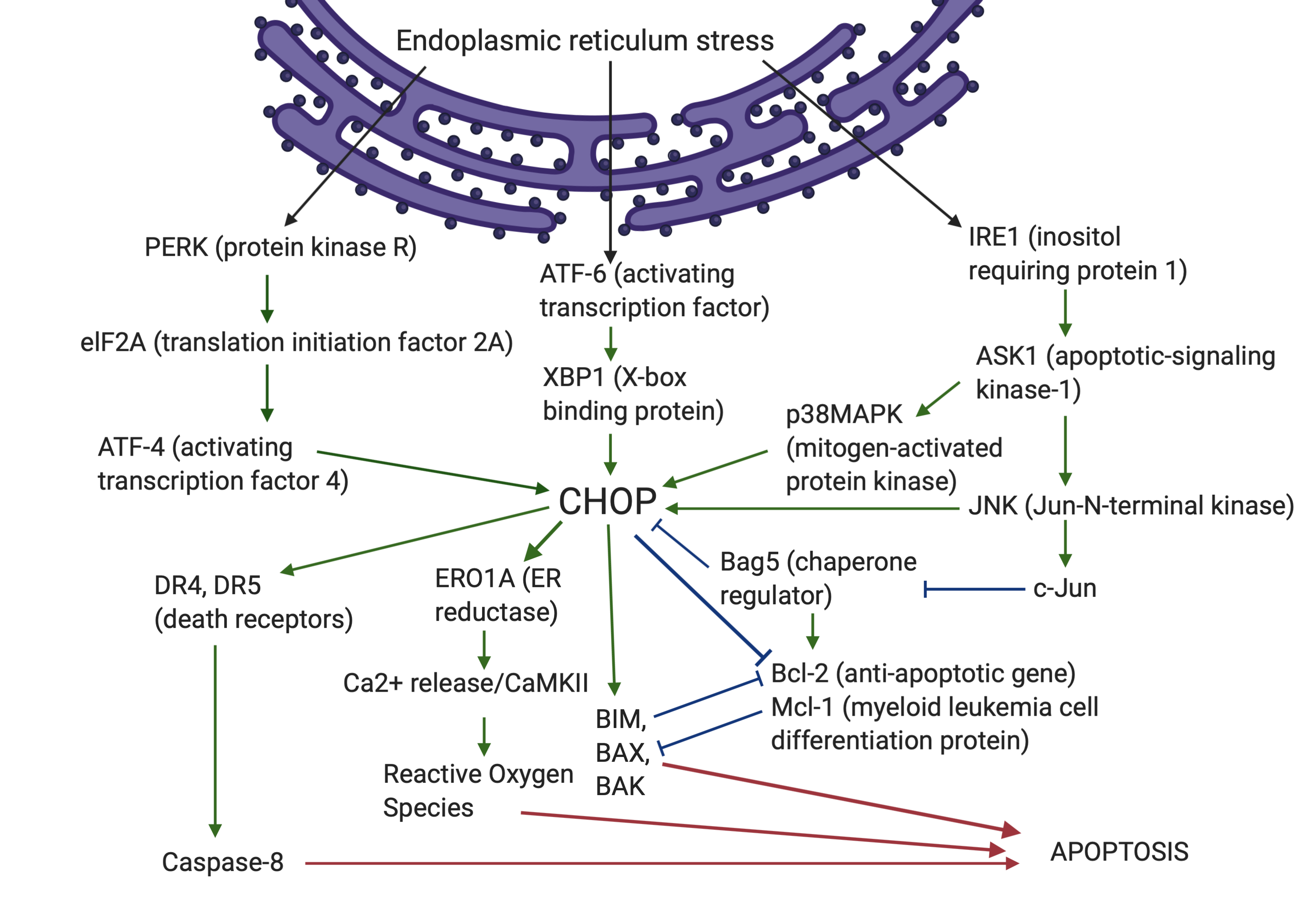
A summary of CHOP upstream and downstream pathways

The PERK-ATF4-CHOP pathway can induce apoptosis by binding to the death receptors and upregulating the expression of death receptor 4 (DR4) and DR5. CHOP also interacts with the phosphorylated transcription factor JUN to form a complex that binds to the promoter region of DR4 in lung cancer cells. The N-terminal domain of CHOP interacts with phosphorylated JUN to form a complex that regulates the expression of DR4 and DR5. CHOP also upregulates the expression of DR5 by binding to the 5′-region of the DR5 gene.

Under prolonged ER stress conditions, activation of the PERK-CHOP pathway will permit DR5 protein levels to rise, which accelerates the formation of the death-inducing signaling complex (DISC) and activates caspase-8, leading to apoptosis

==== Other downstream pathways ====
In addition, CHOP also mediates apoptosis through increasing the expression of the ERO1α (ER reductase) gene, which catalyzes the production of H_{2}O_{2} in the ER. The highly oxidized state of the ER results in H_{2}O_{2} leakage into the cytoplasm, inducing the production of reactive oxygen species (ROS) and a series of apoptotic and inflammatory reactions.

The overexpression of CHOP can lead to cell cycle arrest and result in cell apoptosis. At the same time, CHOP-induced apoptosis can also trigger cell death by inhibiting the expression of cell cycle regulatory protein, p21. The p21 protein inhibits the G1 phase of the cell cycle as well as regulates the activity of pre-apoptotic factors. Identified CHOP-p21 relationship may play a role in changing the cell state from adapting to ER stress towards pre-apoptotic activity.

Under most conditions, CHOP can directly bind to the promoters of downstream related genes. However, under specific conditions, CHOP can cooperate with other transcription factors to affect apoptosis. Recent studies have shown that Bcl-2-associated athanogene 5 (Bag5) is over-expressed in prostate cancer and inhibits ER stress-induced apoptosis. Overexpression of Bag5 results in decreased CHOP and BAX expression, and increased Bcl-2 gene expression. Bag5 overexpression inhibited ER stress-induced apoptosis in the unfolded protein response by suppressing PERK-eIF2-ATF4 and enhancing the IRE1-Xbp1 activity.

In general, the downstream targets of CHOP regulate the activation of apoptotic pathways, however, the molecular interaction mechanisms behind those processes remain to be discovered.

== Interactions ==
DNA damage-inducible transcript 3 has been shown to interact with [proteins]:

- ATF3,
- C-Fos,
- C-jun and
- CEBPB,
- CSNK2A1,
- JunD, and
- RPS3A.

== Clinical significance ==
=== Role in fatty liver and hyperinsulinemia ===
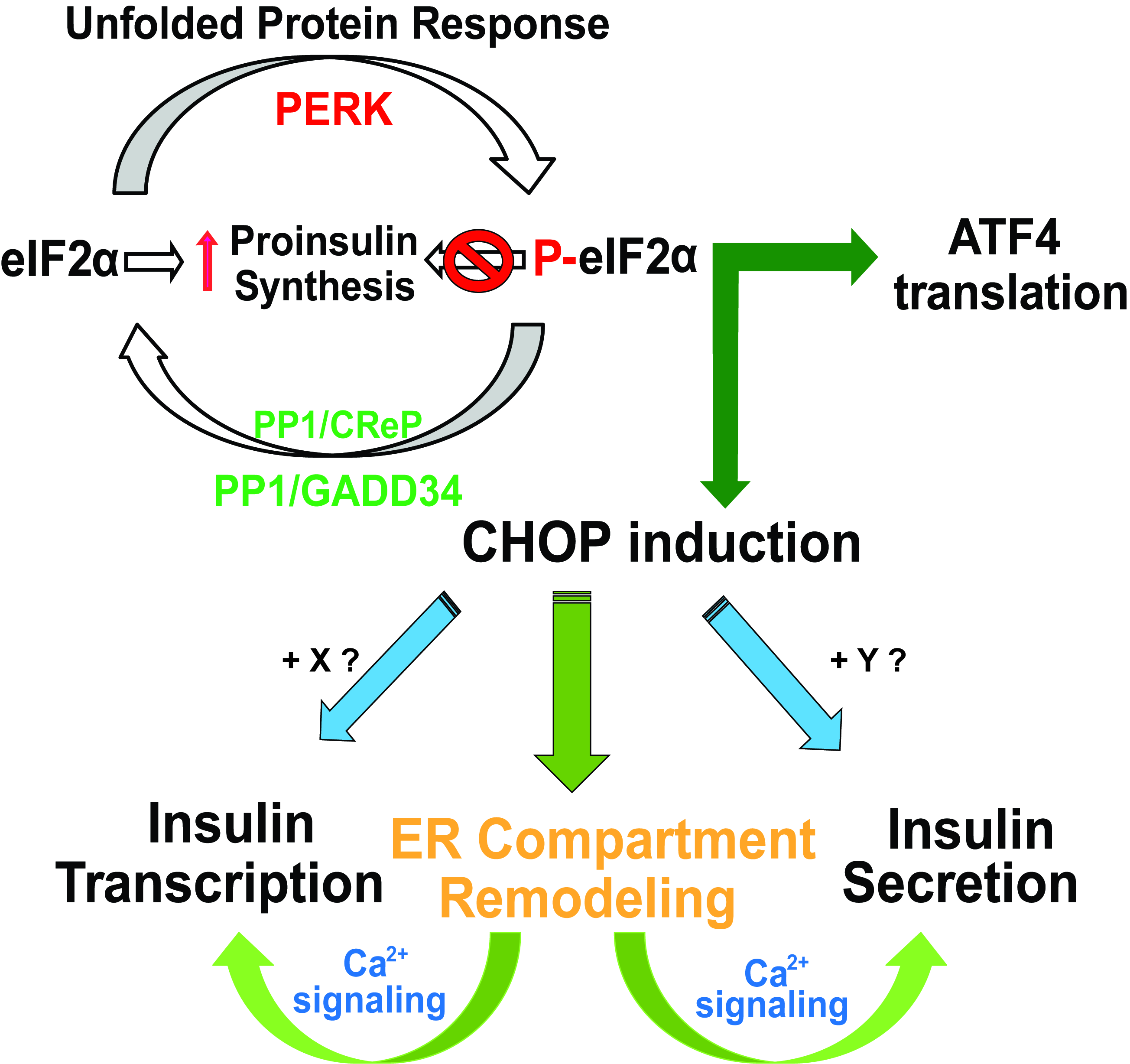
CHOP mediates beta cell ER remodeling

Chop gene deletion has been demonstrated protective against diet induced metabolic syndromes in mice. Mice with germline Chop gene knockout have better glycemic control despite unchanged obesity. A plausible explanation for the observed dissociation between obesity and insulin resistance is that CHOP promotes insulin hypersecretion from pancreatic β cells.

Furthermore, Chop depletion by a GLP1-ASO delivery system was shown to have therapeutic effects of insulin reduction and fatty liver correction, in preclinical mouse models.

=== Role in microbial infection ===
CHOP-induced apoptosis pathways had been identified in cells infected by

- Porcine circovirus type 2 (PERK-eIF2α-ATF4 -CHOP-BCL2 pathway)
- HIV (XBP-1-CHOP-Caspase 3/9 pathway)
- Infectious bronchitis virus (PERK-eIF2α-ATF4/PKR-eIF2α-ATF4 pathway)
- M. tuberculosis (PERK-eIF2α-CHOP pathway)
- Helicobacter pylori (PERK-CHOP or PKR-eIF2α-ATF4 pathway)
- Escherichia coli (CHOP-DR5-Caspase 3/8 pathway)
- Shigella dysenteriae (p38-CHOP-DR5 pathway)

Since CHOP has an important role of apoptosis induction during infection, it is an important target for further research that will help deepen the current understanding of pathogenesis and potentially provide an opportunity for invention of new therapeutic approaches. For example, small molecule inhibitors of CHOP expression may act as therapeutic options to prevent ER stress and microbial infections. Research had shown that small molecule inhibitors of PERK-eIF2α pathway limit PCV2 virus replication.

=== Role in other diseases ===
The regulation of CHOP expression plays an important role in metabolic diseases and in some cancers through its function in mediating apoptosis. The regulation of CHOP expression could be a potential approach to affecting cancer cells through the induction of apoptosis. In the intestinal epithelium, CHOP has been demonstrated to be downregulated under inflammatory conditions (in inflammatory bowel diseases and experimental models of colitis). In this context, CHOP seems to rather regulate the cell cycle than apoptotic processes.

Mutations or fusions of CHOP (e.g. with FUS to form FUS-CHOP) can cause Myxoid liposarcoma.
