= Gcn2 =

Serine/threonine-protein kinase GCN2
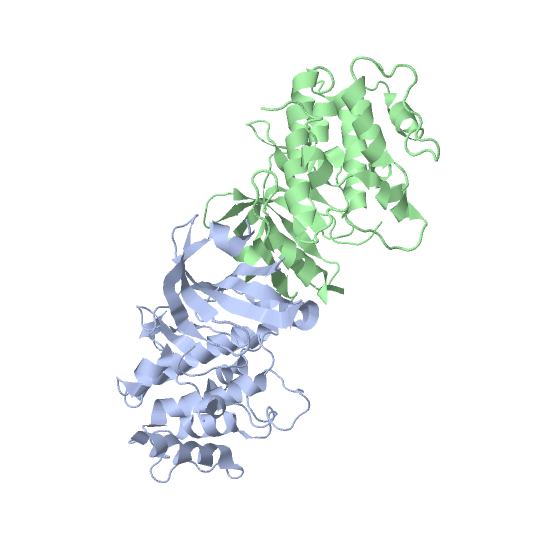
- Crystal structure of the kinase domain of GCN2

Identifiers
- Symbol: GCN2
- Alt. symbols: AAS1
- NCBI gene: 851877
- PDB: 1zyc
- UniProt: P15442
Search for
- Structures: Swiss-model
- Domains: InterPro

GCN2 (general control nonderepressible 2) is a serine/threonine-protein kinase that senses amino acid deficiency through binding to uncharged transfer RNA (tRNA). It plays a key role in modulating amino acid metabolism as a response to nutrient deprivation.

== Introduction ==
GCN2 is the only known eukaryotic initiation factor 2α kinase (eIF2α) in Saccharomyces cerevisiae. It inactivates eIF2α by phosphorylation at Serine 51 under conditions of amino acid deprivation, resulting in repression of general protein synthesis whilst allowing selected mRNA, such as the transcription factor GCN4, to be translated due to regions upstream of the coding sequence. Elevated levels of GCN4 stimulate the expression of amino acid biosynthetic genes, which code for enzymes required to synthesize all 20 major amino acids.

== Structure ==
Protein kinase GCN2 is a multidomain protein and its C-terminus contains a region homologous to histidyl-tRNA synthetase (HisRS) next to the kinase catalytic moiety. This HisRS-like region forms a dimer and dimerization is required for GCN2 function. The crucial contribution to GCN2 function is the promotion of tRNA binding and the stimulation of the kinase domain via physical interaction.

Binding of uncharged tRNA to this synthetase-like domain induces a conformational change in which the GCN2 domains rotate 180° normal to the dimerization surface and thereby transpose from their antiparallel to a parallel orientation. Subsequently, GCN2 is activated.

GCN2 activation results from a conformation that facilitates ATP binding, leading to autophosphorylation of an activation loop which leads to maximal GCN2 kinase activity.

== Function ==
=== Regulation of translation ===
Figure 1:Overview over the functions of GCN2. (GCN1/GCN20=GCN1p/GCN20p binding site; PsiKD = unknown function; KD = Kinase Domain; HisRS = histidyl-tRNA synthetase) Adapted from

GCN2 inhibits general translation by phosphorylation of eIF-2α at serine 51 within 15 min of amino acid deprivation, which then subsequently increases the affinity for the guanine exchange factor eIF2B to sequester eIF-2α leading to reduced formation of the ternary complex (TC) consisting of eIF2, GTP and the initiator Met-tRNA required for translation initiation. eIF2 containing a phosphorylated alpha subunit shows an increased affinity for its only GEF, eIF2B, but eIF2B is only able to exchange GDP with GTP from unphosphorylated eIF2. So the recycling of eIF2, needed for TC formation, is inhibited by phosphorylation of eIF-2α, which in the end leads to a reduction of global translation rates.

An opposing effect of the reduced availability of TC is the induction of GCN4 expression by translational regulation. Four short ORF's exist in the leader of the GCN4 mRNA. 40S Ribosomal Subunits scanning the mRNA from 5' have TC bound and translate the first upstream open reading frame (uORF). Under non-starving condition there is enough ternary complex that the subunits rebind it before they reach uORF 4. Translation is again initiated, uORF2,3 or 4 translated and the 40S Subunits subsequently dissociate from GCN4 mRNA. Under starving conditions there is less TC present. Some of the 40S Subunits are not able to rebind TC before they reach uORF 4 but eventually rebind TC before reaching GCN4 coding sequence. Therefore, the reduction in TC formation resulting from GCN2 activation by amino acid starvation leads to the induction of GCN4 translation. GCN4 is the primary regulator in response to amino acid starvation, termed general amino acid control (GAAC). It acts as a transcription factor and activates several genes required for amino acid synthesis.

Recently GCN2 has also been implicated in directing eating behavior in mammals by phosphorylating eIF-2α in the anterior Piriform cortex (APC) of the brain. The molecular mechanisms governing this function are not yet known, but a basic zipper transcription factor called ATF4 is a possible candidate. ATF4 is related to GCN4.

=== Cell cycle control ===
GCN2 also regulates the cell cycle by delaying entry into S phase upon ultraviolet (UV) radiation and exposure to methyl methanesulfonate (MMS). Thereby the cell prevents passing the G1 checkpoint and starting DNA replication when the DNA is damaged. It has been hypothesized, that UV induces nitric oxide synthase activation and NO^{.} production, which leads to the activation of GCN2 and that the cell cycle regulation by GCN2 is independent of eIF2α phosphorylation. Although the causal relationship between GCN2 and cell cycle delay is still under debate, it was suggested that the formation of the pre-replication complex is deferred by GCN2 upon UV-irradiation.

=== Lipid metabolism ===
The absence of essential amino acids causes a downregulation of key components of the lipid synthesis such as the fatty acid synthase. Following leucine-deprivation in mammals, GCN2 decreases the expression of lipogenic genes via SREBP-1c. SREBP-1c actions upon genes regulating fatty-acid and triglyceride synthesis and is reduced by leucine deprivation in the liver in a GCN2-dependent manner.

== Regulation ==
Gcn2 is held in its inactive state via several auto-inhibitory molecular interactions until exposed to an activating signal. Binding of uncharged tRNA to the synthetase-like domain results in allosteric re-arrangements. This leads to Gcn2 auto-phosphorylation at specific sites in the activation loop of the kinase domain. This phosphorylation then allows Gcn2 to efficiently phosphorylate eIF2α.

In yeast cells, GCN2 is kept inactive via phosphorylation at serine 577, which is thought to depend on the activity of TORC1. Inactivation of TORC1 by Rapamycin affects GCN2 and at least partly by dephosphorylation of serine 577. This leads to activation of GCN2 even in amino acid replete cells, probably by increasing the affinity of GCN2 for uncharged tRNA, so that even basal levels permit tRNA binding. However, this phosphorylation site in Gcn2 is not conserved in fission yeast or in mammalian cells.

Another stimulatory input to GCN2 is exerted by a complex of GCN1/GCN20. GCN1/GCN20 shows structural similarity to eEF3, a factor important in the binding of tRNA to ribosomes. The GCN1/GCN20 complex physically interacts with GCN2 by binding to its N-terminus. It is thought that GCN1/GCN20 facilitates the transfer of tRNA from the ribosomal A site to the HisRS-like domain of GCN2. An additional mechanism of regulation of this protein is through the conserved protein IMPACT, that acts both in yeast, nematodes and mammals as an inhibitor of GCN2.

== Homologues ==
There are also GCN2 homologues in Neurospora crassa, C. elegans, Drosophila melanogaster and mice. Thus, GCN2 may be the most widespread and founding member of the eIF-2α kinase subfamily.

== See also ==
- Eukaryotic initiation factors
- The three subunits of eIF2:
  - α – EIF2S1
  - β – EIF2S2
  - γ – EIF2S3
- Kinases of eIF2
  - HRI (Heme-regulated inhibitor kinase) or EIF2AK1
  - PKR (Protein kinase R)
  - PERK (PKR-like ER-localized eIF2α kinase)
- EIF2AK4
