= Amino acid response =

Mechanism triggered in mammalian cells by amino acid starvation

Amino acid response is the mechanism triggered in mammalian cells by amino acid starvation.

The amino acid response pathway is triggered by shortage of any essential amino acid, and results in an increase in activating transcription factor ATF4, which in turn affects many processes by sundry pathways to limit or increase the production of other proteins.

Essential amino acids are crucial to maintain homeostasis within an organism. Diet plays an important role in the health of an organism, as evidence ranging from human epidemiological to model organism experimental data suggests that diet-dependent pathways impact a variety of adult stem cells.

== Amino acid response pathway ==
=== Amino acid deficiency detection ===
At low concentration of amino acid, GCN2 is activated due to the increase level of uncharged tRNA molecules. Uncharged tRNA activates GCN2 due to the displacement of the protein kinase moiety from a bipartite tRNA-binding domain. Activated GCN2 phosphorylates itself and eIF2α, it triggers a transcriptional and translational response to restore amino acid homeostasis by affecting the utilization, acquisition, and mobilization of amino acid in an organism.

=== Increased synthesis of ATF4 ===
In homeostasis, eIF2 combines with guanosine triphosphate (GTP) to activate the mRNA which will start transcription and simultaneously lead to the hydrolysis of GTP so that the process can start again. However during an essential amino acid shortage, P-eIF2α is phosphorylated and binds tightly to eIF2B preventing GDP from turning back to GTP leading to fewer mRNAs being activated and fewer proteins being synthesized. This response causes translation to be increased for some mRNAs, including ATF4, which regulates the transcription of other genes.

== Proteins increased by the amino acid response ==
Some of the proteins whose concentration is increased by the amino acid response include:

- Membrane transporters
- Transcription factors from the basic region/leucine zipper (bZIP) superfamily
- Growth factors
- Metabolic enzymes

== Leucine starvation ==
Starvation induces the lysosomal retention of leucine such that it requires RAG-GTPases and the lysosomal protein complex regulator. PCAF is recruited specifically to the CHOP amino acid response element to enhance the ATF4 transcriptional activity.
