= Fosigotifator =

Chemical compound

Clinical data
- Other names: ABBV-CLS-7262; Fosigotifator sodium tromethamine

Legal status
- Legal status: Investigational

Identifiers
- IUPAC name: [(2S)-1,4-Bis[[2-(4-chloro-3-fluorophenoxy)acetyl]amino]-2-bicyclo[2.2.2]octanyl]oxymethyl dihydrogen phosphate
- CAS Number: 2415715-84-1 2945073-88-9 (sodium tromethamine)
- PubChem CID: 153563259; 166177193
- DrugBank: DB19409
- ChemSpider: 129309304
- UNII: 3FQ7XKK8AY; BN9FN5629V
- KEGG: D13118; D13119
- ChEMBL: ChEMBL5315045

Chemical and physical data
- Formula: C_{25}H_{27}Cl_{2}F_{2}N_{2}O_{9}P
- Molar mass: 639.37 g·mol^{−1}
- 3D model (JSmol): Interactive image
- SMILES: C1CC2(CCC1(C[C@@H]2OCOP(=O)(O)O)NC(=O)COC3=CC(=C(C=C3)Cl)F)NC(=O)COC4=CC(=C(C=C4)Cl)F
- InChI: InChI=1S/C25H27Cl2F2N2O9P/c26-17-3-1-15(9-19(17)28)37-12-22(32)30-24-5-7-25(8-6-24,21(11-24)39-14-40-41(34,35)36)31-23(33)13-38-16-2-4-18(27)20(29)10-16/h1-4,9-10,21H,5-8,11-14H2,(H,30,32)(H,31,33)(H2,34,35,36)/t21-,24?,25?/m0/s1; Key:IURMHIZNAHLQRX-ANYOXOOPSA-N

Fosigotifator is an experimental small-molecule related to ISRIB that activates the eukaryotic initiation factor eIF2; it was licensed by Calico from University of California, San Francisco and partnered with AbbVie. Abbvie and Calico ran clinical trials to determine if the drug can treat amyotrophic lateral sclerosis (ALS) and major depressive disorder. A formulation of fosigotifator, as its monosodium phosphate salt mixed with tromethamine, is known as ABBV-CLS-7262. Fosigotifator has been patented by AbbVie and Calico as a prodrug for modulation of the integrated stress response pathway.

In January 2025 Abbvie and Calico announced that the drug had failed a Phase 2/3 trial in ALS; in November 2025 Abbvie ended its partnership with Calico.
