= ISRIB =

Experimental drug

Clinical data
- ATC code: none

Pharmacokinetic data
- Elimination half-life: 8 h

Identifiers
- IUPAC name: trans-N,N′-(Cyclohexane-1,4-diyl)bis(2-(4-chlorophenoxy)acetamide)
- CAS Number: 1597403-47-8
- PubChem CID: 1011240
- ChemSpider: 30773985
- UNII: S6SZR97SBZ
- CompTox Dashboard (EPA): DTXSID601045380

Chemical and physical data
- Formula: C_{22}H_{24}Cl_{2}N_{2}O_{4}
- Molar mass: 451.34 g·mol^{−1}
- 3D model (JSmol): Interactive image
- SMILES: O=C(COC1=CC=C(Cl)C=C1)N[C@@H]2CC[C@@H](NC(COC3=CC=C(Cl)C=C3)=O)CC2
- InChI: InChI=1S/C22H24Cl2N2O4/c23-15-1-9-19(10-2-15)29-13-21(27)25-17-5-7-18(8-6-17)26-22(28)14-30-20-11-3-16(24)4-12-20/h1-4,9-12,17-18H,5-8,13-14H2,(H,25,27)(H,26,28)/t17-,18-; Key:HJGMCDHQPXTGAV-IYARVYRRSA-N

ISRIB (short for "integrated stress response inhibitor") is an experimental tool compound that blocks the integrated stress response, restoring the cell’s translation capacity. It showed promising results in mouse models of brain disorders but efforts to develop a drug based on it, had failed as of 2025.

== Discovery ==
It was discovered by Carmela Sidrauski in the laboratory of Peter Walter at University of California, San Francisco (UCSF) through a semi-automated screening of a large library of small molecules seeking inhibitors of PERK signalling; it was found to block the integrated stress response when measured by eIF2α phosphorylation with an IC_{50} of 5 nM. It has been shown to inhibit eIF2α phosphorylation-induced stress granule (SG) formation.

== Mechanism of action ==
Cryo-EM structures of ISRIB bound to eIF2B indicates that ISRIB staples together two tetrameric eIF2B (βγδε) subcomplexes into a 8-meric complex (βγδε)_{2}, which is more amenable to binding EIF2B alpha subunits. As a result, ISRIB accelerates the assembly of EIF2B into an active 10-meric form, thereby increasing the amount of active EIF2B. Because phosphorylation of eIF2α exerts its effects by depleting the stock of active EIF2B, increasing the EIF2B supply would reverse its effects. ISRIB does not increase the total supply of EIF2B, so in cell cultures with very high levels of stress, the ISR can still proceed after the inactivating the cell's entire stock of EIF2B.

== Preclinical work ==
Testing in 2013 found ISRIB to produce significant nootropic effects in mice, as measured by enhancement of spatial and fear-associated learning in standard water-maze and conditioned environment tests.

Testing of ISRIB in 2017 indicated improved the ability of brain-injured mice to learn and form memories on memory tests, thus appearing to reverse impairments from traumatic brain injury. ISRIB treatment also corrects spatial memory deficits and improves working memory in aged mice.

Further research on the drug by Sidrauski has shown that the molecule restored memory formation in mice months after traumatic brain injuries. In mice, it has reduced age-related cognitive decline and given healthy mice improved memory.

== Further refinement and clinical development ==
The technology was licensed to Calico in 2015 and Sidrauski was hired to help find possible drugs based on ISRIB. She heads the laboratory in which it is being studied.

Calico partnered with Abbvie to create fosigotifator based on ISRIB and the companies began to develop fosigotifator for amyotrophic lateral sclerosis (ALS) and major depressive disorder. In January 2025 Abbott and Calico announced that the drug had failed a Phase 2/3 trial in ALS; in July 2025 Abbott ended its partnership with Calico.

== See also ==
- Meclofenoxate
- Salubrinal
