= GCN2 =

GCN2 may refer to:

- GCN2, a symbol for EIF2AK4, an enzyme
- Gcn2, a serine/threonine-protein kinase
- Graphics Core Next, a series of microarchitectures for GPUs by AMD
