= Endoplasmic reticulum stress in beta cells =

Beta cells are heavily engaged in the synthesis and secretion of insulin. They are therefore particularly sensitive to endoplasmic reticulum (ER) stress and the subsequent unfolded protein response (UPR). Severe or prolonged episodes of ER stress can lead to the death of beta cells, which can contribute to the development of both type I and type II diabetes.

ER stress in beta cells links obesity to type 2 diabetes and inflammation to type 1 diabetes.

ER stress in peripheral cells has also been linked to insulin resistance, a precursor to type 2 diabetes.

== Activation of ER stress ==
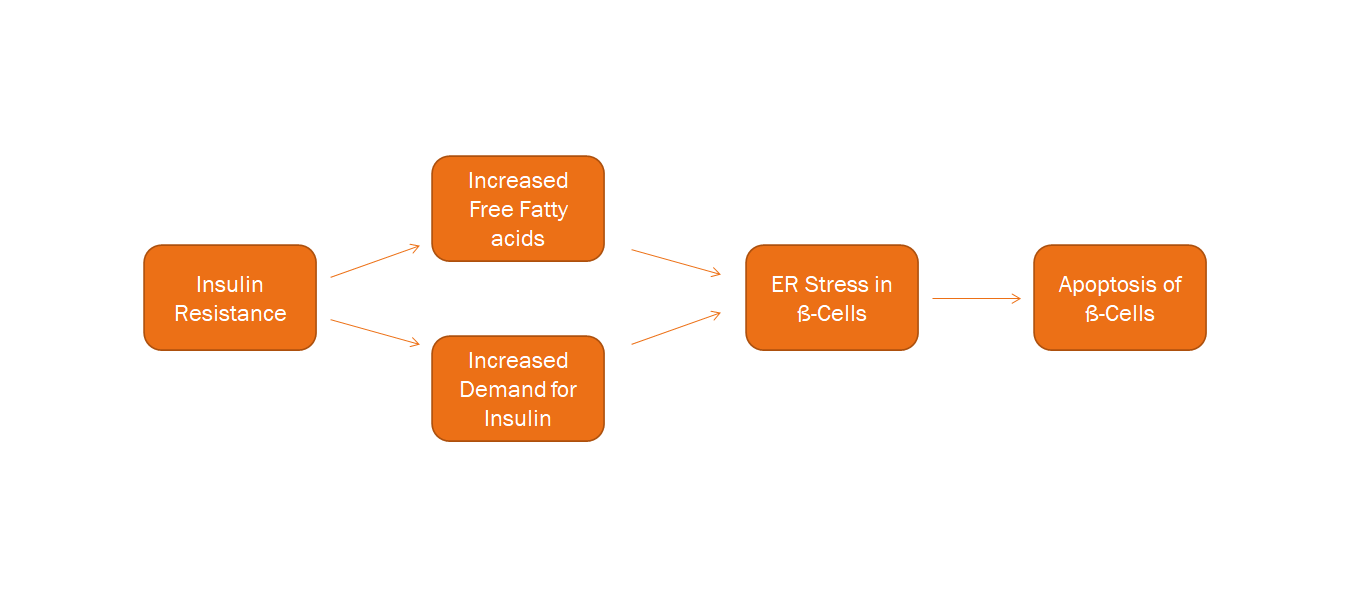
A model of how ER stress is involved in β-cell death and type II diabetes mellitus

ER stress can be activated by a variety of factors. In experimental conditions, excessive lipid (which can happen following obesity, a common condition preceding type 2 diabetes) and pro-inflammatory cytokines (which can occur following an inflammation, a common cause for type 1 diabetes) can activate ER stress in beta cells.

Causes such as defective protein processing and trafficking or inappropriate calcium regulation are likely in lipid-mediated ER stress. On the other hand, cytokines are likely to activate ER stress by decreasing the calcium pump Serca2b (also known as Atp2a2), leading to subsequent depletion in ER calcium stores.

== ER stress and inflammation ==
All three of the pathways involved in the resolution of ER stress by the unfolded protein response (UPR) are also related to inflammation. The two pathways are very connected and both have been shown to activate each other

== Resolution of ER stress ==
Activation of ER stress by lipids results in a typical unfolded protein response (UPR) to primarily restore ER function, whereas cytokine-activated ER stress leads to an atypical UPR that preferentially activate apoptosis in beta cells.

The UPR is activated when GRP78, a.k.a. BiP, a protein-folding chaperone, is recruited to assist in protein folding. In β-cells, insulin production is a major source of improperly folded protein. GRP78 is normally bound to the luminal domain of ATF6, IRE1, and PERK, which prevents them from initiating their respective pathways of the UPR. When GRP78 is recruited to assist in protein folding, unbound ATF6, IRE1 and PERK are able to initiate the UPR. The UPR is also activated by cytokines

ER stress activates apoptosis through C/EBP homologous protein (CHOP)

== Measurement ==
ER stress can be measured using quantitative real-time RT-PCR to measure the rate at which XBP1 is cleaved by IRE1 when the UPR is activated. XBP1 mRNA cleavage leads to the translation of a transcription factor for genes that resolve ER stress. Measuring the rate at which XBP1 is cleaved gives a quantitative measure of ER stress in real time.
