= 40S ribosomal protein S3a =

Protein-coding gene in the species Homo sapiens

RPS3A

Identifiers
- Aliases: RPS3A, FTE1, MFTL, S3A, ribosomal protein S3A
- External IDs: OMIM: 180478; MGI: 1202063; GeneCards: RPS3A
Available structures
PDB	Ortholog search: PDBe RCSB
PDB	List of PDB id codes 4UG0, 4V6X, 5AJ0, 5FLX, 4D61, 4D5L, 5A2Q, 4UJD, 4UJE, 4UJC

Gene location (Human)
Chr.	Chromosome 4 (human)
Band	4q31.3	Start	151,099,624 bp
Band	4q31.3	End	151,104,642 bp

Gene location (Mouse)
Chr.	Chromosome 3 (mouse)
Band	3|3 F1	Start	86,045,247 bp
Band	3|3 F1	End	86,050,009 bp
RNA expression pattern
Bgee	Human / Mouse (ortholog); Top expressed in: ganglionic eminence; left ovary; Achilles tendon; ventricular zone; canal of the cervix; right ovary; lymph node; ectocervix; body of uterus; endometrium / Top expressed in: ovary; ventricular zone; uterus; thymus; ganglionic eminence; epiblast; embryo; esophagus; spleen; bone marrow; More reference expression data
BioGPS	n/a
Gene ontology
Molecular function	protein binding; RNA binding; structural constituent of ribosome; mRNA 5'-UTR binding
Cellular component	cytoplasm; ribosome; focal adhesion; intracellular anatomical structure; nucleolus; extracellular exosome; nucleus; nucleoplasm; extracellular matrix; endoplasmic reticulum; cytosol; cytosolic small ribosomal subunit; synapse; ribonucleoprotein complex
Biological process	cell differentiation; viral transcription; negative regulation of apoptotic process; SRP-dependent cotranslational protein targeting to membrane; translational initiation; nuclear-transcribed mRNA catabolic process, nonsense-mediated decay; protein biosynthesis; rRNA processing; cytoplasmic translation
Sources:Amigo / QuickGO
Orthologs
Databases	NCBI: entry; OMA: entry
Species	Human	Mouse
Entrez	6189	20091
Ensembl	ENSG00000145425	ENSMUSG00000028081
UniProt	P61247	P97351
RefSeq (mRNA)	NM_001267699; NM_001006	NM_016959
RefSeq (protein)	NP_000997; NP_001254628	NP_058655
Location (UCSC)	Chr 4: 151.1 – 151.1 Mb	Chr 3: 86.05 – 86.05 Mb
PubMed search
- Wikidata
View/Edit Human	View/Edit Mouse

40S ribosomal protein S3a is a protein that in humans is encoded by the RPS3A gene.

Ribosomes, the organelles that catalyze protein synthesis, consist of a small 40S subunit and a large 60S subunit. Together these subunits are composed of 4 RNA species and approximately 80 structurally distinct proteins. This gene encodes a ribosomal protein that is a component of the 40S subunit. The protein belongs to the S3AE family of ribosomal proteins. It is located in the cytoplasm. Disruption of the gene encoding rat ribosomal protein S3a, also named v-fos transformation effector protein, in v-fos-transformed rat cells results in reversion of the transformed phenotype. Transcript variants utilizing alternative transcription start sites have been described. This gene is co-transcribed with the U73A and U73B small nucleolar RNA genes, which are located in its fourth and third introns, respectively. As is typical for genes encoding ribosomal proteins, there are multiple processed pseudogenes of this gene dispersed through the genome.

== Interactions ==
RPS3A has been shown to interact with DNA damage-inducible transcript 3.
