= BAG domain =

BAG
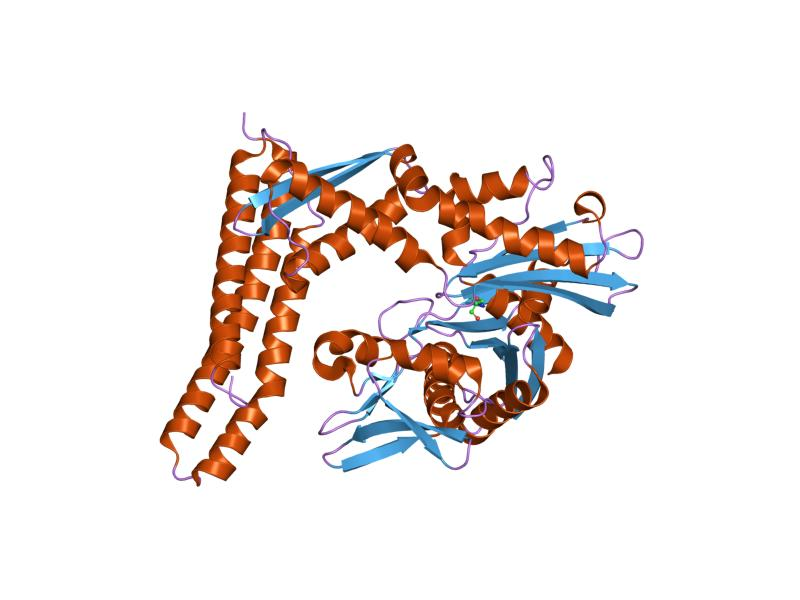
- crystal structure of a bag domain in complex with the hsc70 atpase domain

Identifiers
- Symbol: BAG
- Pfam: PF02179
- InterPro: IPR003103
- SMART: BAG
- SCOP2: 1hx1 / SCOPe / SUPFAM
Available protein structures:
- PDB: IPR003103 PF02179 (ECOD; PDBsum)
- AlphaFold: IPR003103; PF02179

In molecular biology, BAG domains are protein domains found in proteins that are modulators of chaperone activity.

== Function ==
They bind to HSP70/HSC70 proteins and promote substrate release. The proteins have anti-apoptotic activity and increase the anti-cell death function of BCL-2 induced by various stimuli. BAG-1 promotes cell growth by binding to and stimulating Raf-1 activity. The binding of Hsp70 to BAG-1 diminishes Raf-1 signalling and inhibits subsequent events, such as DNA synthesis, and arrests the cell cycle. BAG-1 has been suggested to function as a molecular switch that encourages cells to proliferate under normal conditions but to become quiescent under stressful conditions.

== Structure ==
BAG-family proteins contain a single BAG domain, except for human BAG-5, which has four BAG repeats. The BAG domain is a conserved region located at the C terminus of the BAG-family proteins that binds the ATPase domain of Hsc70/Hsp70.

The BAG domain has 110–124 amino acids and is composed of three anti-parallel alpha-helices, each approximately 30–40 amino acids in length. The first and second helices interact with the serine/threonine kinase Raf-1, and the second and third helices are the sites of the BAG domain interaction with the ATPase domain of Hsc70/Hsp70.

== Distribution ==
The BAG domain is evolutionarily conserved, and BAG domain-containing proteins have been described in a variety of organisms including Mus musculus (mouse), Xenopus spp., Drosophila spp., Bombyx mori (silk moth), Caenorhabditis elegans, Saccharomyces cerevisiae (baker's yeast), Schizosaccharomyces pombe (fission yeast), and Arabidopsis thaliana (mouse-ear cress).

== Mechanism ==
BAG-1 binds to the serine/threonine kinase Raf-1 or Hsc70/Hsp70 in a mutually exclusive interaction. Binding of the BAG domain to the ATPase domain is mediated by both electrostatic and hydrophobic interactions in BAG-1 and requires energy.
