= EIF-2 kinase =

Protein serine/threonine kinase that is induced by interferon

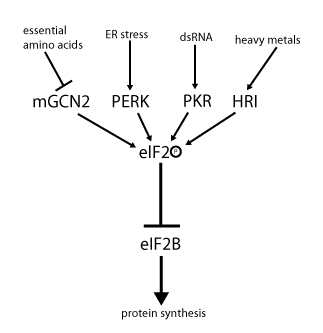
Regulation of translation initiation via phosphorylation of Ser51 in eIF2's α-subunit.

eIF-2-alpha kinase is a kinase enzyme that phosphorylates eIF2α. There are four forms in mammals:

- EIF2AK1: heme-regulated inhibitor kinase (HRI)
- EIF2AK2: the double-stranded RNA-dependent kinase (protein kinase R, PKR)
- EIF2AK3: also known as "PKR-like endoplasmic reticulum kinase" (PEK/PERK)
- EIF2AK4: also known as GCN2

These are all responsible for the phosphorylation of the alpha subunit of eIF-2 at serine 51, one of the best-characterized mechanisms for down-regulating protein synthesis in eukaryotes as a part of cellular stress response.
