= ATF4 =

Mammalian protein found in Homo sapiens

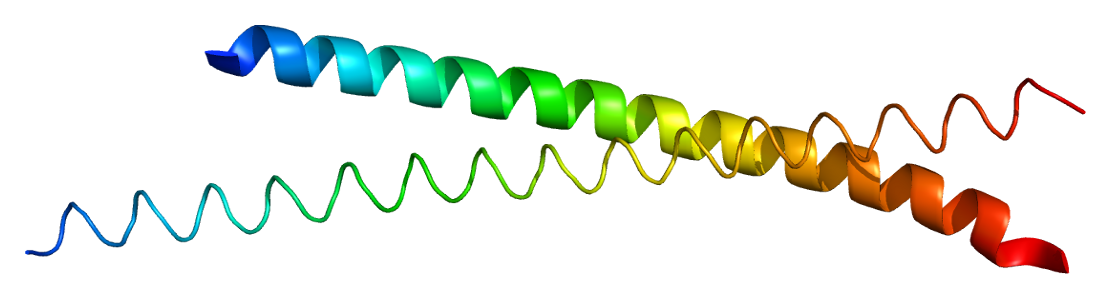

Identifiers
- Aliases: ATF4, CREB-2, CREB2, TAXREB67, TXREB, activating transcription factor 4
- External IDs: OMIM: 604064; MGI: 88096; GeneCards: ATF4
Available structures
PDB	Ortholog search: PDBe RCSB
PDB	List of PDB id codes 1CI6

Gene location (Human)
Chr.	Chromosome 22 (human)
Band	22q13.1	Start	39,519,695 bp
Band	22q13.1	End	39,522,683 bp

Gene location (Mouse)
Chr.	Chromosome 15 (mouse)
Band	15 E1|15 37.85 cM	Start	80,139,385 bp
Band	15 E1|15 37.85 cM	End	80,141,742 bp
RNA expression pattern
Bgee	Human / Mouse (ortholog); Top expressed in: muscle layer of sigmoid colon; popliteal artery; tibial arteries; body of stomach; subcutaneous adipose tissue; fundus; right coronary artery; body of pancreas; left coronary artery; Descending thoracic aorta / Top expressed in: ankle joint; calvaria; fetal liver hematopoietic progenitor cell; granulocyte; lacrimal gland; plantaris muscle; temporal muscle; islet of Langerhans; triceps brachii muscle; muscle of thigh; More reference expression data
BioGPS	n/a
Gene ontology
Molecular function	DNA binding; sequence-specific DNA binding; DNA-binding transcription factor activity; DNA-binding transcription activator activity, RNA polymerase II-specific; transcription factor binding; RNA polymerase II cis-regulatory region sequence-specific DNA binding; core promoter sequence-specific DNA binding; protein C-terminus binding; protein binding; leucine zipper domain binding; protein heterodimerization activity; protein kinase binding; DNA-binding transcription factor activity, RNA polymerase II-specific; RNA polymerase II transcription regulatory region sequence-specific DNA binding
Cellular component	cytoplasm; ATF1-ATF4 transcription factor complex; ATF4-CREB1 transcription factor complex; transcription regulator complex; dendrite membrane; nucleus; Lewy body core; nuclear periphery; membrane; plasma membrane; nucleoplasm; microtubule organizing center; neuron projection; cytoskeleton; CHOP-ATF4 complex; centrosome; protein-containing complex; RNA polymerase II transcription regulator complex
Biological process	gamma-aminobutyric acid signaling pathway; gluconeogenesis; regulation of transcription, DNA-templated; positive regulation of transcription from RNA polymerase II promoter in response to endoplasmic reticulum stress; regulation of transcription by RNA polymerase II; negative regulation of oxidative stress-induced neuron death; cellular response to amino acid starvation; mRNA transcription by RNA polymerase II; circadian regulation of gene expression; response to endoplasmic reticulum stress; PERK-mediated unfolded protein response; response to manganese-induced endoplasmic reticulum stress; positive regulation of transcription, DNA-templated; positive regulation of neuron apoptotic process; intrinsic apoptotic signaling pathway in response to endoplasmic reticulum stress; positive regulation of gene expression; positive regulation of transcription from RNA polymerase II promoter in response to oxidative stress; circadian rhythm; negative regulation of potassium ion transport; positive regulation of transcription by RNA polymerase II; positive regulation of transcription from RNA polymerase II promoter in response to arsenic-containing substance; cellular response to glucose starvation; negative regulation of translational initiation in response to stress; rhythmic process; cellular response to UV; positive regulation of transcription from RNA polymerase II promoter in response to stress; cellular amino acid metabolic process; transcription by RNA polymerase II; transcription, DNA-templated; positive regulation of apoptotic process; positive regulation of vascular endothelial growth factor production; positive regulation of transcription by RNA polymerase I; cellular response to dopamine; response to toxic substance; neuron differentiation; cellular response to oxygen-glucose deprivation; positive regulation of endoplasmic reticulum stress-induced intrinsic apoptotic signaling pathway; cellular calcium ion homeostasis; positive regulation of biomineral tissue development; negative regulation of cold-induced thermogenesis; positive regulation of vascular associated smooth muscle cell apoptotic process; positive regulation of sodium-dependent phosphate transport
Sources:Amigo / QuickGO
Orthologs
Databases	NCBI: entry; OMA: entry
Species	Human	Mouse
Entrez	468	11911
Ensembl	ENSG00000128272	ENSMUSG00000042406
UniProt	P18848	Q06507
RefSeq (mRNA)	NM_182810; NM_001675	NM_001287180; NM_009716
RefSeq (protein)	NP_001666; NP_877962	NP_001274109; NP_033846
Location (UCSC)	Chr 22: 39.52 – 39.52 Mb	Chr 15: 80.14 – 80.14 Mb
PubMed search
- Wikidata
View/Edit Human	View/Edit Mouse

Activating transcription factor 4 (tax-responsive enhancer element B67), also known as ATF4, is a protein that in humans is encoded by the ATF4 gene.

== Function ==
This gene encodes a transcription factor that was originally identified as a widely expressed mammalian DNA binding protein that could bind a tax-responsive enhancer element in the LTR of HTLV-1. The encoded protein was also isolated and characterized as the cAMP-response element binding protein 2 (CREB-2).

The protein encoded by this gene belongs to a family of DNA-binding proteins that includes the AP-1 family of transcription factors, cAMP-response element binding proteins (CREBs) and CREB-like proteins. These transcription factors share a leucine zipper region that is involved in protein–protein interactions, located C-terminal to a stretch of basic amino acids that functions as a DNA-binding domain. Two alternative transcripts encoding the same protein have been described. Two pseudogenes are located on the X chromosome at q28 in a region containing a large inverted duplication.

ATF4 is an established effector of the Integrated Stress Response in animal cells, coupling the stress-induced phosphorylation of the α subunit of translation initiation factor 2 (eIF2α) to activation of downstream gene expression programs. Unique features of the ATF4 mRNA subordinate its translation to changing levels of phosphorylated eIF2α (as described below).

ATF4 transcription factor is also known to play role in osteoblast differentiation along with RUNX2 and osterix. Terminal osteoblast differentiation, represented by matrix mineralization, is significantly inhibited by the inactivation of JNK. JNK inactivation downregulates expression of ATF-4 and, subsequently, matrix mineralization. IMPACT protein regulates ATF4 in C. elegans to promote lifespan.

ATF4 is also involved in the cannabinoid Δ^{9}-tetrahydrocannabinol–induced apoptosis in cancer cells, by the proapoptotic role of the stress protein p8 via its upregulation of the endoplasmic reticulum stress-related genes ATF4, CHOP, and TRB3.

== Translation ==
The translation of ATF4 is dependent on upstream open reading frames located in the 5'UTR. The location of the second uORF, aptly named uORF2, overlaps with the ATF4 open-reading frame. During normal conditions, the uORF1 is translated, and then translation of uORF2 occurs only after eIF2-TC has been reacquired. Translation of the uORF2 requires that the ribosomes pass by the ATF4 ORF, whose start codon is located within uORF2. This leads to its repression. However, during stress conditions, the 40S ribosome will bypass uORF2 because of a decrease in concentration of eIF2-TC, which means the ribosome does not acquire one in time to translate uORF2. Instead ATF4 is translated.

== See also ==
- Activating transcription factor
