= Small nucleolar RNA SNORD73 =

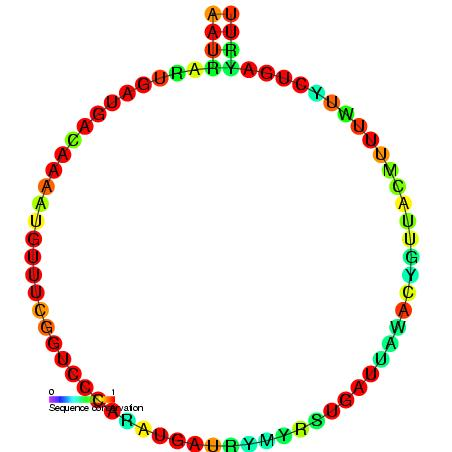
- Predicted secondary structure and sequence conservation of SNORD73

Identifiers
- Symbol: SNORD73
- Alt. Symbols: U73
- Rfam: RF00071

Other data
- RNA type: Gene; snRNA; snoRNA; CD-box
- Domain: Eukaryota
- GO: GO:0006396 GO:0005730
- SO: SO:0000593
- PDB structures: PDBe

In molecular biology, snoRNA U73 (also known as SNORD73) is a non-coding RNA (ncRNA) molecule which functions in the biogenesis (modification) of other small nuclear RNAs (snRNAs). This type of modifying RNA is located in the nucleolus of the eukaryotic cell which is a major site of snRNA biogenesis. It is known as a small nucleolar RNA (snoRNA) and also often referred to as a guide RNA.

snoRNA U73 is a member of the C/D box class of snoRNAs which contain the conserved sequence motifs known as the C box (UGAUGA) and the D box (CUGA). Most of the members of the box C/D family function in directing site-specific 2'-O-methylation of substrate RNAs.

U73 is encoded within the introns of ribosomal protein S3a and contains a 12 nucleotide region of complementarity to a conserved sequence in 28S ribosomal RNA (rRNA). U73 has been demonstrated to function as a 2'-O-ribose methylation guide RNA for pre-28S rRNA.
