= Salubrinal =

Chemical compound

Identifiers
- IUPAC name: 3-phenyl-N-[2,2,2-trichloro-1-[[(8-quinolinylamino)thioxomethyl]amino]ethyl]-2-propenamide
- CAS Number: 405060-95-9
- PubChem CID: 5717801
- ChemSpider: 4654442
- UNII: J8PSF5Z8KJ
- ChEBI: CHEBI:131923
- ChEMBL: ChEMBL180127
- CompTox Dashboard (EPA): DTXSID70420852
- ECHA InfoCard: 100.237.268

Chemical and physical data
- Formula: C_{21}H_{17}Cl_{3}N_{4}OS
- Molar mass: 479.80 g·mol^{−1}
- 3D model (JSmol): Interactive image
- SMILES: C1=CC=C(C=C1)/C=C/C(=O)NC(C(Cl)(Cl)Cl)NC(=S)NC2=CC=CC3=C2N=CC=C3
- InChI: InChI=1S/C21H17Cl3N4OS/c22-21(23,24)19(27-17(29)12-11-14-6-2-1-3-7-14)28-20(30)26-16-10-4-8-15-9-5-13-25-18(15)16/h1-13,19H,(H,27,29)(H2,26,28,30)/b12-11+; Key:LCOIAYJMPKXARU-VAWYXSNFSA-N

Salubrinal is a drug which acts as a specific inhibitor of eIF2α phosphatase enzymes and is primarily used experimentally, to study stress responses in eukaryotic cells associated with the action of eIF2. Salubrinal indirectly inhibits eIF2 as a result of reduced dephosphorylation of its α-subunit, resulting in activation of stress response pathways usually triggered by events such as oxidative stress or buildup of unfolded protein in the endoplasmic reticulum. Salubrinal has putative therapeutic value due to its function, but is as yet only used experimentally. Salubrinal is being studied at Indiana University for its potential to fight osteoporosis and accelerate bone healing.
