= Cellular stress response =

Cellular stress response is the wide range of molecular changes that cells undergo in response to environmental stressors, including extremes of temperature, exposure to toxins, and mechanical damage. Cellular stress responses can also be caused by some viral infections. The various processes involved in cellular stress responses serve the adaptive purpose of protecting a cell against unfavorable environmental conditions, both through short term mechanisms that minimize acute damage to the cell's overall integrity, and through longer term mechanisms which provide the cell a measure of resiliency against similar adverse conditions.

== General characteristics ==
Cellular stress responses are primarily mediated through what are classified as stress proteins. Stress proteins often are further subdivided into two general categories: those that only are activated by stress, or those that are involved both in stress responses and in normal cellular functioning. The essential character of these stress proteins in promoting the survival of cells has contributed to them being remarkably well conserved across phyla, with nearly identical stress proteins being expressed in the simplest prokaryotic cells as well as the most complex eukaryotic ones.

Stress proteins can exhibit widely varied functions within a cell- both during normal life processes and in response to stress. For example, studies in Drosophila have indicated that when DNA encoding certain stress proteins exhibit mutation defects, the resulting cells have impaired or lost abilities such as normal mitotic division and proteasome-mediated protein degradation. As expected, such cells were also highly vulnerable to stress, and ceased to be viable at elevated temperature ranges.

Although stress response pathways are mediated in different ways depending on the stressor involved, cell type, etc., a general characteristic of many pathways – especially ones where heat is the principal stressor – is that they are initiated by the presence and detection of denatured proteins. Because conditions such as high temperatures often cause proteins to denature, this mechanism enables cells to determine when they are subject to high temperature without the need of specialized thermosensitive proteins. If a cell under normal unstressed conditions has denatured proteins artificially injected into it, it will trigger a stress response.

== Response to heat ==
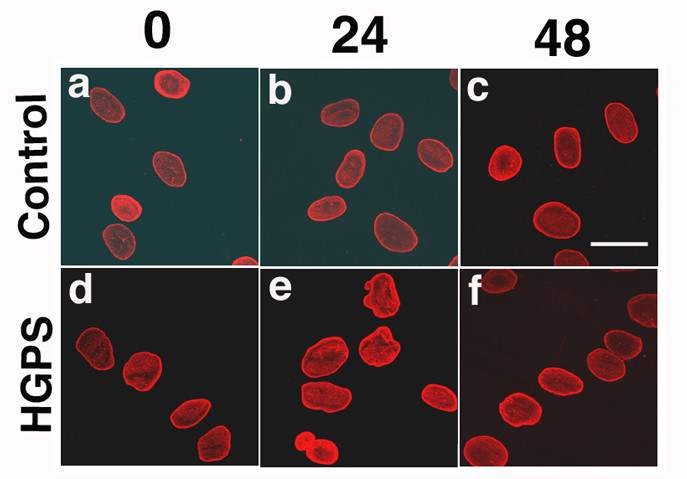
Cells subjected to heat shock. Cells in slide 'e' exhibit dysmorphic nuclei as a result of this exposure to stress, however 24 hours later cells largely recovered, as shown in slide 'f'.

The heat shock response involves a class of stress proteins called heat shock proteins. These can help defend a cell against damage by acting as chaperones in protein folding, ensuring that proteins assume their necessary shape and do not become denatured. This role is especially crucial since elevated temperature would, on its own, increase the concentrations of malformed proteins. Heat shock proteins can also participate in marking malformed proteins for degradation via ubiquitin tags.

== Response to toxins ==
Many toxins end up activating similar stress proteins to heat or other stress-induced pathways because it is fairly common for some types of toxins to achieve their effects - at least in part - by denaturing vital cellular proteins. For example, many heavy metals can react with sulfhydryl groups stabilizing proteins, resulting in conformational changes. Other toxins that either directly or indirectly lead to the release of free radicals can generate misfolded proteins.

== Effects on cancer ==
Cell stress can have both cancer-suppressing and cancer-promoting effects. Increased levels of oxidant stress may kill cancer cells. Different forms of cellular stress can cause protein misfolding and aggregation leading to proteotoxicity. Tumor microenvironment stress leads to canonical and noncanonical endoplasmic stress (ER) responses, which trigger autophagy and are engaged during proteotoxic challenges to clear unfolded or misfolded proteins and damaged organelles to mitigate stress. There are links between unfolded protein responses (UPRs) and autophagy, oxidative stress, and inflammatory response signals in ER stress: aggregation of unfolded/misfolded proteins in the endoplasmic reticulum lumen causes the UPR to be activated. Chronic ER stress produces endogenous or exogenous damage to cells and activates UPR, which leads to impaired intracellular calcium and redox homeostasis. Cancer cells may become dependent on stress response mechanisms that involve lysosomal macromolecule degradation, or even autophagy that recycles entire organelles. However, tumor cells exhibit therapeutic stress resistance-associated secretory phenotype involving extracellular vesicles such as oncosomes and heat shock proteins. Cancer cells with aberrant regulatory modifications in the chromatin of certain genes respond with different kinetics to cell stress, triggering expression of genes that protect them from cytotoxic conditions, and also by activating expression of genes that influence surrounding tissue in a manner that facilitates tumor growth.

== Applications ==
Early research has suggested that cells which are better able to synthesize stress proteins and do so at the appropriate time are better able to withstand damage caused by ischemia and reperfusion. In addition, many stress proteins overlap with immune proteins. These similarities have medical applications in terms of studying the structure and functions of both immune proteins and stress proteins, as well as the role each plays in combating disease.

== See also ==
- Integrated stress response
