= ATF3 =

Protein-coding gene in humans

Identifiers
- Aliases: ATF3, activating transcription factor 3
- External IDs: OMIM: 603148; MGI: 109384; GeneCards: ATF3

Gene location (Human)
Chr.	Chromosome 1 (human)
Band	1q32.3	Start	212,565,334 bp
Band	1q32.3	End	212,620,777 bp

Gene location (Mouse)
Chr.	Chromosome 1 (mouse)
Band	1 H6|1 96.28 cM	Start	190,902,493 bp
Band	1 H6|1 96.28 cM	End	190,950,236 bp
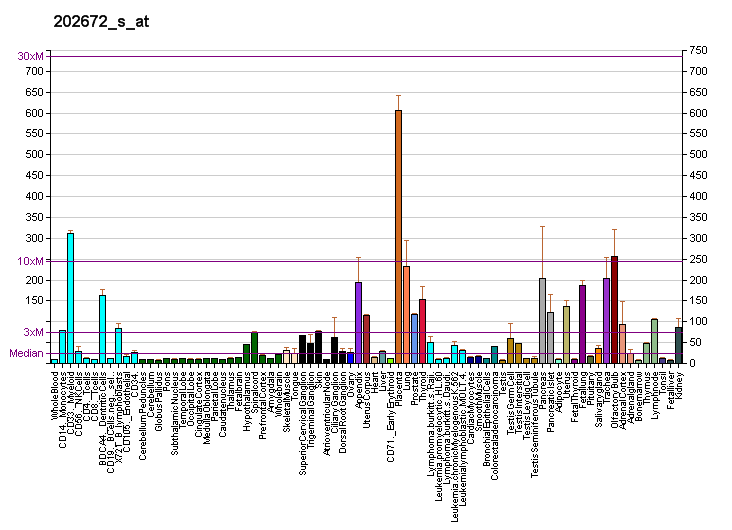
RNA expression pattern
Bgee	Human / Mouse (ortholog); Top expressed in: vena cava; gastric mucosa; gallbladder; saphenous vein; trachea; urethra; pericardium; skin of thigh; left uterine tube; cardia / Top expressed in: granulocyte; plantaris muscle; lumbar spinal ganglion; islet of Langerhans; intestinal villus; jejunum; muscle of thigh; stroma of bone marrow; sciatic nerve; endocardial cushion; More reference expression data
BioGPS	More reference expression data
Gene ontology
Molecular function	transcription cis-regulatory region binding; protein homodimerization activity; protein binding; RNA polymerase II transcription regulatory region sequence-specific DNA binding; DNA-binding transcription repressor activity, RNA polymerase II-specific; protein heterodimerization activity; identical protein binding; DNA-binding transcription activator activity, RNA polymerase II-specific; DNA binding; transcription corepressor activity; DNA-binding transcription factor activity; RNA polymerase II cis-regulatory region sequence-specific DNA binding; DNA-binding transcription factor activity, RNA polymerase II-specific
Cellular component	nucleolus; nucleoplasm; CHOP-ATF3 complex; nucleus
Biological process	regulation of transcription by RNA polymerase II; positive regulation of transcription from RNA polymerase II promoter in response to endoplasmic reticulum stress; positive regulation of cell population proliferation; skeletal muscle cell differentiation; regulation of transcription from RNA polymerase II promoter in response to arsenic-containing substance; gluconeogenesis; cellular response to amino acid starvation; negative regulation of transcription, DNA-templated; regulation of transcription, DNA-templated; positive regulation of TRAIL-activated apoptotic signaling pathway; transcription, DNA-templated; positive regulation of gene expression; PERK-mediated unfolded protein response; positive regulation of transcription by RNA polymerase II; negative regulation of ERK1 and ERK2 cascade; negative regulation of transcription by RNA polymerase II; endoplasmic reticulum unfolded protein response; transcription by RNA polymerase II; positive regulation of endoplasmic reticulum stress-induced intrinsic apoptotic signaling pathway
Sources:Amigo / QuickGO
Orthologs
Databases	NCBI: entry; OMA: entry
Species	Human	Mouse
Entrez	467	11910
Ensembl	ENSG00000162772	ENSMUSG00000026628
UniProt	P18847	Q60765
RefSeq (mRNA)	NM_001030287; NM_001040619; NM_001206484; NM_001206485; NM_001206486 NM_001206488; NM_001674; NM_004024	NM_007498
RefSeq (protein)	NP_001025458; NP_001035709; NP_001193413; NP_001193415; NP_001193417 NP_001665	NP_031524
Location (UCSC)	Chr 1: 212.57 – 212.62 Mb	Chr 1: 190.9 – 190.95 Mb
PubMed search
- Wikidata
View/Edit Human	View/Edit Mouse

Cyclic AMP-dependent transcription factor ATF-3 is a protein that, in humans, is encoded by the ATF3 gene.

== Function ==
Activating transcription factor 3 is a member of the mammalian activation transcription factor/cAMP responsive element-binding (CREB) protein family of transcription factors. Multiple transcript variants encoding two different isoforms have been found for this gene. The longer isoform represses rather than activates transcription from promoters with ATF binding elements. The shorter isoform (deltaZip2) lacks the leucine zipper protein-dimerization motif and does not bind to DNA, and it stimulates transcription, it is presumed, by sequestering inhibitory co-factors away from the promoter. It is possible that alternative splicing of the ATF3 gene may be physiologically important in the regulation of target genes.

== Clinical significance ==
ATF-3 is induced upon physiological stress in various tissues. It is also a marker of regeneration following injury of dorsal root ganglion neurons, as injured regenerating neurons activate this transcription factor. Functional validation studies have shown that ATF3 can promote regeneration of peripheral neurons, but is not capable of promoting regeneration of central nervous system neurons.

== See also ==
- Activating transcription factor

== Interactions ==
ATF3 has been shown to interact with:

- C-jun,
- DDIT3
- JunD,
- P53, and
- SMAD3.
