= BAG5 =

Protein-coding gene in the species Homo sapiens

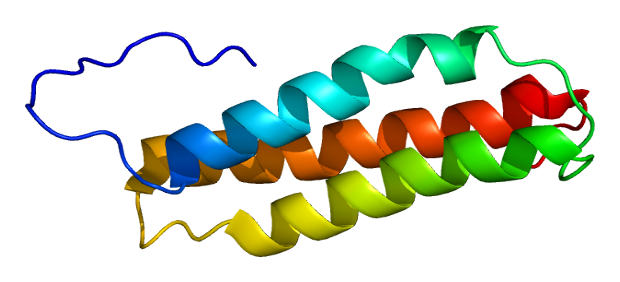

Identifiers
- Aliases: BAG5, BAG-5, BCL2 associated athanogene 5, BAG cochaperone 5, CMD2F
- External IDs: OMIM: 603885; MGI: 1917619; GeneCards: BAG5
Available structures
PDB	Ortholog search: PDBe RCSB
PDB	List of PDB id codes 2D9D, 3A8Y

Gene location (Human)
Chr.	Chromosome 14 (human)
Band	14q32.33	Start	103,556,545 bp
Band	14q32.33	End	103,562,657 bp

Gene location (Mouse)
Chr.	Chromosome 12 (mouse)
Band	12|12 F1	Start	111,675,922 bp
Band	12|12 F1	End	111,679,691 bp
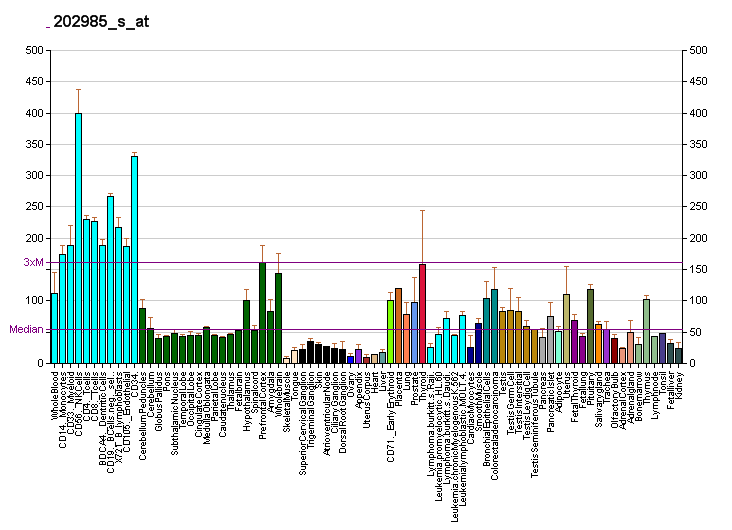

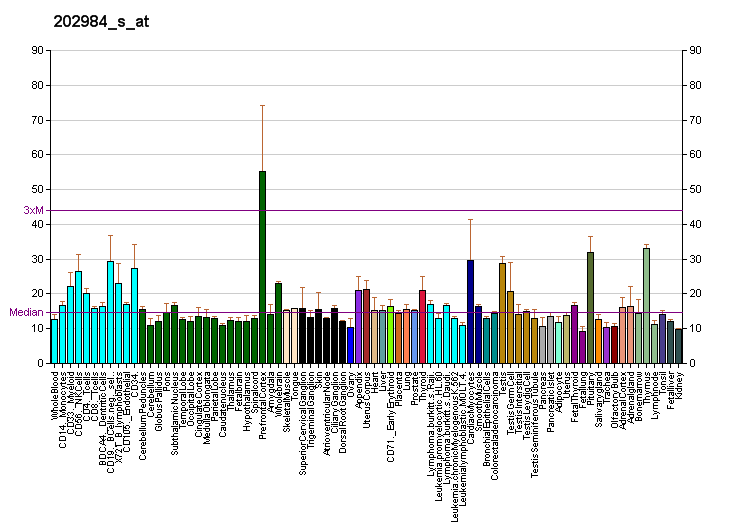
RNA expression pattern
Bgee	Human / Mouse (ortholog); Top expressed in: sperm; left testis; right testis; skin of thigh; skin of hip; endothelial cell; caput epididymis; gums; corpus epididymis; gingival epithelium / Top expressed in: seminiferous tubule; spermatid; saccule; otic vesicle; spermatocyte; otic placode; supraoptic nucleus; dorsal striatum; interventricular septum; aortic valve; More reference expression data
BioGPS	More reference expression data
Gene ontology
Molecular function	chaperone binding; protein binding; protein kinase binding; ubiquitin protein ligase binding; adenyl-nucleotide exchange factor activity
Cellular component	cytosol; membrane; mitochondrion; inclusion body; perinuclear region of cytoplasm; nucleus
Biological process	neuron death; negative regulation of neuron projection development; Golgi organization; regulation of inclusion body assembly; negative regulation of protein ubiquitination; protein folding; negative regulation of ubiquitin-protein transferase activity; negative regulation of proteasomal ubiquitin-dependent protein catabolic process; regulation of cellular response to heat; negative regulation of oxidative stress-induced intrinsic apoptotic signaling pathway; negative regulation of protein refolding; regulation of ubiquitin-protein transferase activity; protein stabilization
Sources:Amigo / QuickGO
Orthologs
Databases	NCBI: entry; OMA: entry
Species	Human	Mouse
Entrez	9529	70369
Ensembl	ENSG00000166170	ENSMUSG00000049792
UniProt	Q9UL15	Q8CI32
RefSeq (mRNA)	NM_004873; NM_001015048; NM_001015049	NM_027404; NM_001324480; NM_001324481; NM_001324482
RefSeq (protein)	NP_001015048; NP_001015049; NP_004864	NP_001311409; NP_001311410; NP_001311411; NP_081680
Location (UCSC)	Chr 14: 103.56 – 103.56 Mb	Chr 12: 111.68 – 111.68 Mb
PubMed search
- Wikidata
View/Edit Human	View/Edit Mouse

BAG family molecular chaperone regulator 5 is a protein that in humans is encoded by the BAG5 gene.

The protein encoded by this gene is a member of the BAG1-related protein family. BAG1 is an anti-apoptotic protein that functions through interactions with a variety of cell apoptosis and growth related proteins including BCL-2, Raf-protein kinase, steroid hormone receptors, growth factor receptors and members of the heat shock protein 70 kDa family. This protein contains a BAG domain near the C-terminus, which could bind and inhibit the chaperone activity of Hsc70/Hsp70. Three transcript variants encoding two different isoforms have been found for this gene.
