= EIF2S2 =

Protein-coding gene in the species Homo sapiens

Identifiers
- Aliases: EIF2S2, EIF2, EIF2B, EIF2beta, PPP1R67, eIF-2-beta, eukaryotic translation initiation factor 2 subunit beta
- External IDs: OMIM: 603908; MGI: 1914454; GeneCards: EIF2S2

Gene location (Human)
Chr.	Chromosome 20 (human)
Band	20q11.22	Start	34,088,309 bp
Band	20q11.22	End	34,112,243 bp

Gene location (Mouse)
Chr.	Chromosome 2 (mouse)
Band	2 H1|2 76.89 cM	Start	154,713,330 bp
Band	2 H1|2 76.89 cM	End	154,734,855 bp
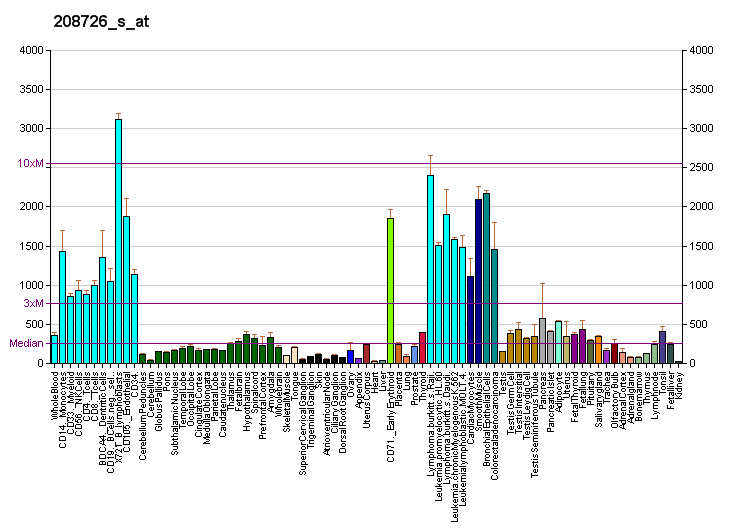

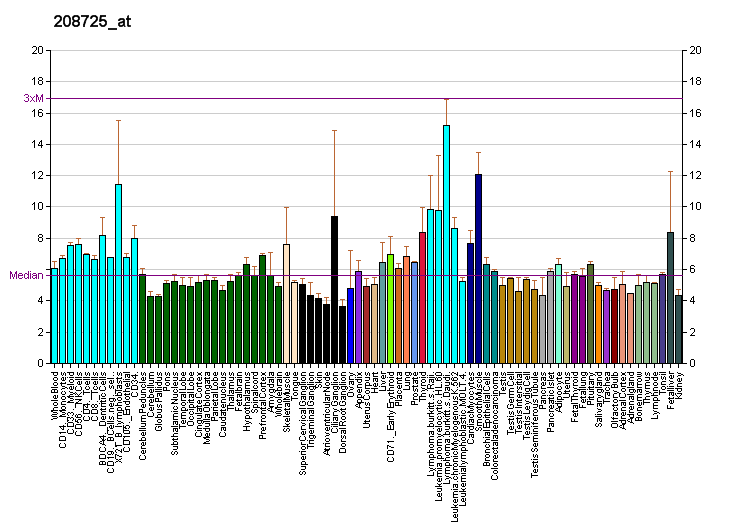
RNA expression pattern
Bgee	Human / Mouse (ortholog); Top expressed in: cartilage tissue; oral cavity; glutes; right ventricle; trabecular bone; deltoid muscle; muscle of arm; biceps brachii; mucosa of sigmoid colon; triceps brachii muscle / Top expressed in: morula; blastocyst; yolk sac; tail of embryo; embryo; genital tubercle; muscle of thigh; embryo; spermatocyte; ventricular zone; More reference expression data
BioGPS	More reference expression data
Gene ontology
Molecular function	translation factor activity, RNA binding; protein binding; translation initiation factor activity; metal ion binding; RNA binding; mRNA binding; translation initiation factor binding
Cellular component	cytoplasm; cytosol; nucleus; eukaryotic translation initiation factor 2 complex
Biological process	translational initiation; male germ cell proliferation; male gonad development; in utero embryonic development; transmembrane transport; protein biosynthesis; formation of translation preinitiation complex; formation of cytoplasmic translation initiation complex
Sources:Amigo / QuickGO
Orthologs
Databases	NCBI: entry; OMA: entry
Species	Human	Mouse
Entrez	8894	67204
Ensembl	ENSG00000125977	ENSMUSG00000074656
UniProt	P20042	Q99L45
RefSeq (mRNA)	NM_003908; NM_001316363; NM_001316364	NM_026030
RefSeq (protein)	NP_001303292; NP_001303293; NP_003899	NP_080306
Location (UCSC)	Chr 20: 34.09 – 34.11 Mb	Chr 2: 154.71 – 154.73 Mb
PubMed search
- Wikidata
View/Edit Human	View/Edit Mouse

Eukaryotic translation initiation factor 2 subunit 2 (eIF2β) is a protein that in humans is encoded by the EIF2S2 gene.

== Function ==
Eukaryotic translation initiation factor 2 (eIF2) functions in the early steps of protein synthesis by forming a ternary complex with GTP and initiator tRNA and binding to a 40S ribosomal subunit. eIF2 is composed of three subunits, alpha (α), beta (β, this article), and gamma (γ), with the protein encoded by this gene representing the beta subunit. The beta subunit catalyzes the exchange of GDP for GTP, which recycles the eIF2 complex for another round of initiation.

== Regulation ==
Both eIF2α and eIF2β expression is regulated by the NRF1 transcription factor.

== See also ==
- eIF2
