= Upstream open reading frame =

An upstream open reading frame (uORF) is an open reading frame (ORF) within the 5' untranslated region (5'UTR) of an mRNA. uORFs can regulate eukaryotic gene expression. Translation of the uORF typically inhibits downstream expression of the primary ORF. However, in some genes such as yeast GCN4, translation of specific uORFs may increase translation of the main ORF.

== In humans ==
Approximately 50% of human genes contain uORFs in their 5'UTR, and when present, these cause reductions in protein expression. Human peptides derived from translated uORFs can be detected from cellular material with a mass spectrometer. uORFs were found in two thirds of proto-oncogenes and related proteins.

== In bacteria ==
In bacteria, uORFs are called leader peptides and were originally discovered on the basis of their impact on the regulation of genes involved in the synthesis or transport of amino acids.

== See also ==
- Eukaryotic translation
- Short open reading frame
- Micropeptides
- Leaky scanning
