= EIF2S3 =

Protein-coding gene in humans

Identifiers
- Aliases: EIF2S3, EIF2, EIF2G, EIF2gamma, eIF-2gA, eukaryotic translation initiation factor 2 subunit gamma, MRXSBRK, MEHMO
- External IDs: OMIM: 300161; MGI: 1349431; GeneCards: EIF2S3
Enzyme activity
| EC # | BRENDA | ExPASy | KEGG | MetaCyc |
|---|---|---|---|---|
| 3.6.5.3 | ↗ | ↗ | ↗ | ↗ |

Gene location (Human)
| Chr. | X chromosome (human) |
| Band | Xp22.11 | Start | 24,054,946 bp |
| Band | Xp22.11 | End | 24,078,810 bp |

Gene location (Mouse)
| Chr. | X chromosome (mouse) |
| Band | X C3|X 41.52 cM | Start | 93,232,313 bp |
| Band | X C3|X 41.52 cM | End | 93,256,468 bp |
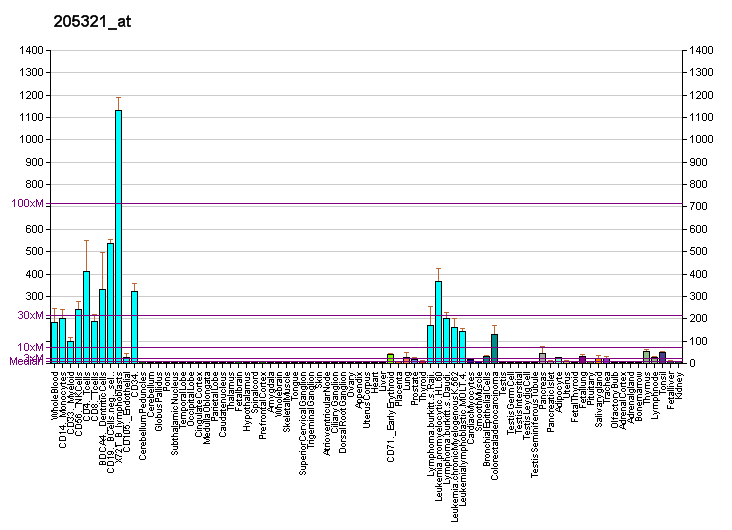
RNA expression pattern
| Bgee | Human / Mouse (ortholog); Top expressed in: germinal epithelium; parietal pleura; skin of arm; visceral pleura; tibia; mucosa of ileum; monocyte; epithelium of nasopharynx; palpebral conjunctiva; epithelium of colon / Top expressed in: molar; maxillary prominence; genital tubercle; mandibular prominence; hand; epiblast; foot; ventricular zone; medial ganglionic eminence; atrium; More reference expression data |
| BioGPS | More reference expression data |
Gene ontology
| Molecular function | nucleotide binding; GTP binding; translation factor activity, RNA binding; protein binding; translation initiation factor activity; GTPase activity; cadherin binding |
| Cellular component | cytoplasm; cytosol; extracellular exosome; nucleus; eukaryotic translation initiation factor 2 complex |
| Biological process | translational initiation; transmembrane transport; protein biosynthesis; formation of translation preinitiation complex |
Sources:Amigo / QuickGO
Orthologs
| Databases | NCBI: entry; OMA: entry |
| Species | Human | Mouse |
| Entrez | 1968 | 26905 |
| Ensembl | ENSG00000130741 | ENSMUSG00000035150 |
| UniProt | P41091 | Q9Z0N1 |
| RefSeq (mRNA) | NM_001415 | NM_012010 |
| RefSeq (protein) | NP_001406 | NP_036140 |
| Location (UCSC) | Chr X: 24.05 – 24.08 Mb | Chr X: 93.23 – 93.26 Mb |
| PubMed search |
- Wikidata
| View/Edit Human | View/Edit Mouse |

Eukaryotic translation initiation factor 2 subunit 3 (eIF2γ) is a protein that in humans is encoded by the EIF2S3 gene.

== Function ==
Eukaryotic translation initiation factor 2 (eIF2) functions in the early steps of protein synthesis by forming a ternary complex with GTP and initiator tRNA and binding to a 40S ribosomal subunit. eIF2 is composed of three subunits, alpha (α), beta (β), and gamma (γ, this article), with the protein encoded by this gene representing the gamma subunit.

== See also ==
- eIF2
