= ATF6 =

Protein-coding gene in humans

Identifiers
- Aliases: ATF6, ATF6A, ACHM7, activating transcription factor 6
- External IDs: OMIM: 605537; MGI: 1926157; GeneCards: ATF6

Gene location (Human)
Chr.	Chromosome 1 (human)
Band	1q23.3	Start	161,766,298 bp
Band	1q23.3	End	161,977,574 bp

Gene location (Mouse)
Chr.	Chromosome 1 (mouse)
Band	1 H3|1 76.96 cM	Start	170,532,243 bp
Band	1 H3|1 76.96 cM	End	170,695,340 bp
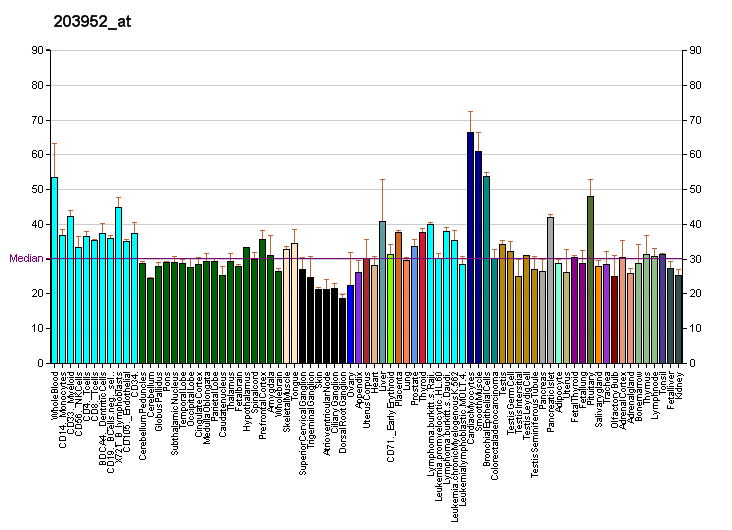

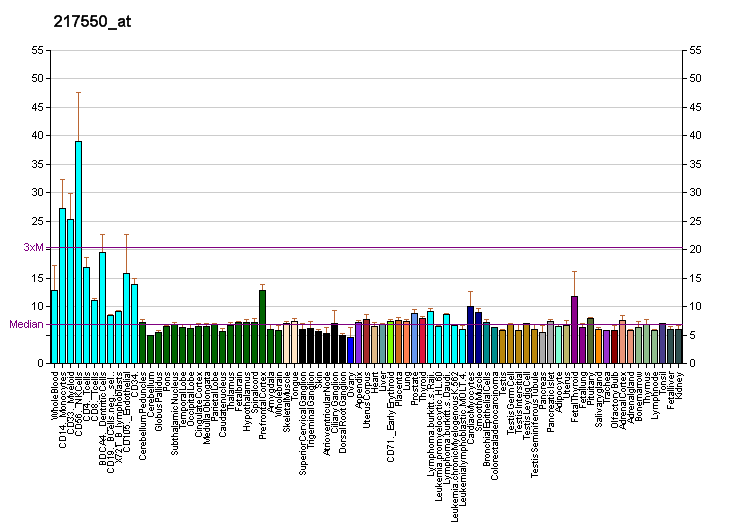
RNA expression pattern
Bgee	Human / Mouse (ortholog); Top expressed in: corpus epididymis; skin of hip; skin of thigh; retinal pigment epithelium; tail of epididymis; synovial joint; caput epididymis; seminal vesicula; saphenous vein; endothelial cell / Top expressed in: myocardium of ventricle; lacrimal gland; submandibular gland; cardiac muscles; cardiac muscle tissue of left ventricle; right ventricle; seminal vesicula; secondary oocyte; stroma of bone marrow; aortic valve; More reference expression data
BioGPS	More reference expression data
Gene ontology
Molecular function	DNA binding; RNA polymerase II transcription regulatory region sequence-specific DNA binding; DNA-binding transcription factor activity; transcription coactivator activity; transcription cis-regulatory region binding; protein binding; identical protein binding; protein heterodimerization activity; ubiquitin protein ligase binding; cAMP response element binding; RNA polymerase II cis-regulatory region sequence-specific DNA binding; DNA-binding transcription activator activity, RNA polymerase II-specific; sequence-specific DNA binding; DNA-binding transcription factor activity, RNA polymerase II-specific
Cellular component	integral component of membrane; Golgi apparatus; nuclear envelope; membrane; endoplasmic reticulum membrane; Golgi membrane; nucleoplasm; integral component of endoplasmic reticulum membrane; endoplasmic reticulum; nucleus; cytosol
Biological process	eye development; regulation of transcription, DNA-templated; positive regulation of transcription from RNA polymerase II promoter in response to endoplasmic reticulum stress; regulation of transcription by RNA polymerase II; transcription, DNA-templated; endoplasmic reticulum unfolded protein response; ATF6-mediated unfolded protein response; response to unfolded protein; protein folding; signal transduction; visual perception; positive regulation of apoptotic process; transcription by RNA polymerase II; positive regulation of transcription by RNA polymerase II; positive regulation of ATF6-mediated unfolded protein response
Sources:Amigo / QuickGO
Orthologs
Databases	NCBI: entry; OMA: entry
Species	Human	Mouse
Entrez	22926	226641
Ensembl	ENSG00000118217	ENSMUSG00000026663
UniProt	P18850	F6VAN0
RefSeq (mRNA)	NM_007348	NM_001081304
RefSeq (protein)	NP_031374	NP_001074773
Location (UCSC)	Chr 1: 161.77 – 161.98 Mb	Chr 1: 170.53 – 170.7 Mb
PubMed search
- Wikidata
View/Edit Human	View/Edit Mouse

Activating transcription factor 6, also known as ATF6, is a protein that, in humans, is encoded by the ATF6 gene and is involved in the unfolded protein response.

== Function ==
ATF6 is an endoplasmic reticulum (ER) stress-regulated transmembrane transcription factor that activates the transcription of ER molecules. Accumulation of misfolded proteins in the endoplasmic reticulum results in the proteolytic cleavage of ATF6. The cytosolic portion of ATF6 will move to the nucleus and act as a transcription factor to cause the transcription of ER chaperones.

== Interactions ==
ATF6 has been shown to interact with YY1 and Serum response factor.

== See also ==
- Activating transcription factor
