= EIF2AK4 =

Protein-coding gene in humans

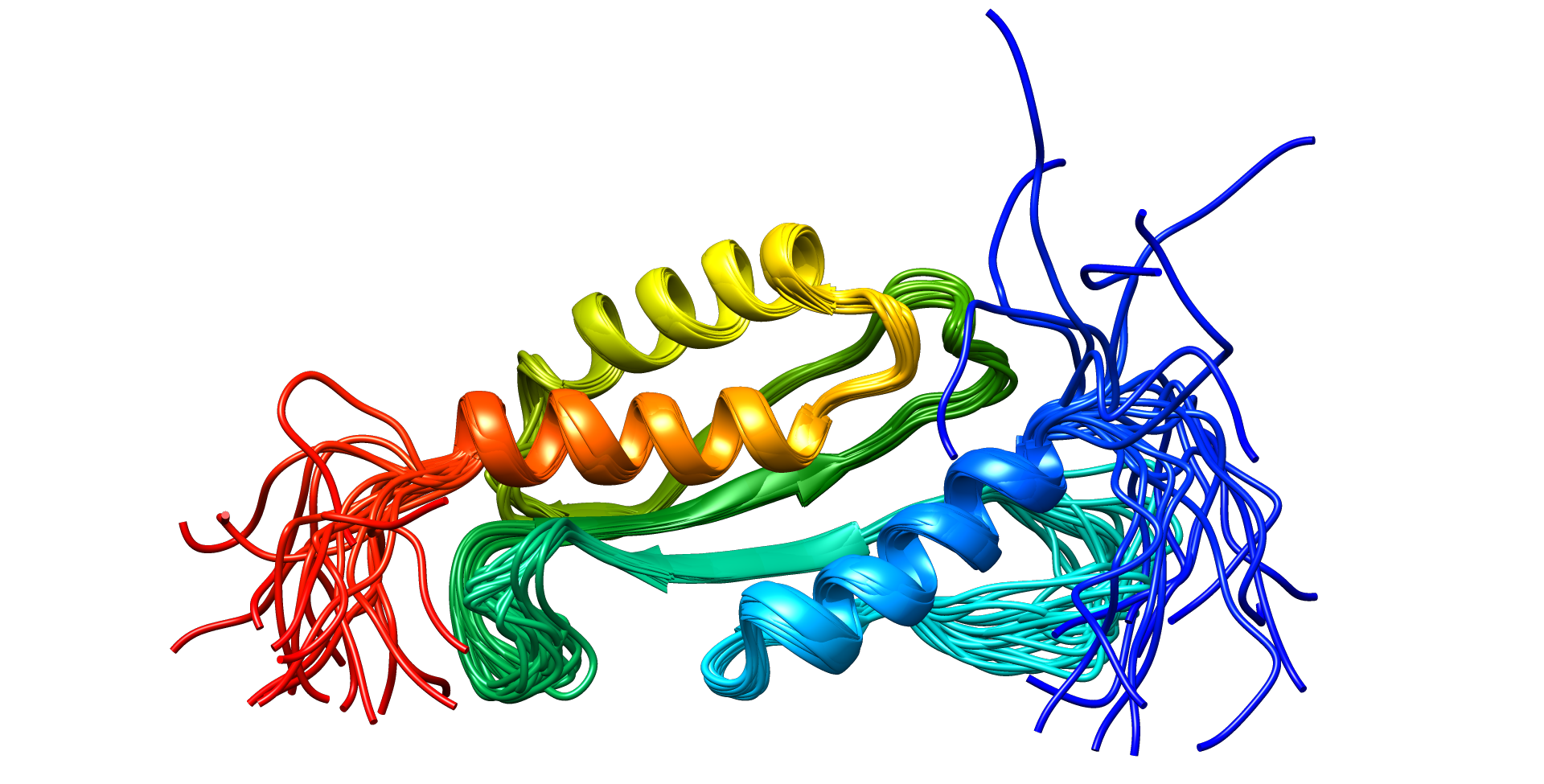

Identifiers
- Aliases: EIF2AK4, GCN2, PVOD2, eukaryotic translation initiation factor 2 alpha kinase 4
- External IDs: OMIM: 609280; MGI: 1353427; GeneCards: EIF2AK4
Available structures
PDB	Ortholog search: PDBe RCSB
PDB	List of PDB id codes 1UKX, 4OTN
Enzyme activity
EC #	BRENDA	ExPASy	KEGG	MetaCyc
2.7.11.1	↗	↗	↗	↗

Gene location (Human)
Chr.	Chromosome 15 (human)
Band	15q15.1	Start	39,934,115 bp
Band	15q15.1	End	40,035,591 bp

Gene location (Mouse)
Chr.	Chromosome 2 (mouse)
Band	2|2 E5	Start	118,219,099 bp
Band	2|2 E5	End	118,305,715 bp
RNA expression pattern
Bgee	Human / Mouse (ortholog); Top expressed in: anterior pituitary; bone marrow cell; stromal cell of endometrium; synovial membrane; tibia; Achilles tendon; Brodmann area 9; nucleus accumbens; left uterine tube; caudate nucleus / Top expressed in: medullary collecting duct; secondary oocyte; primary oocyte; zygote; saccule; otic placode; Paneth cell; external carotid artery; epithelium of lens; internal carotid artery; More reference expression data
BioGPS	n/a
Gene ontology
Molecular function	transferase activity; nucleotide binding; protein kinase activity; tRNA binding; kinase activity; protein serine/threonine kinase activity; RNA binding; ATP binding; eukaryotic translation initiation factor 2alpha kinase activity
Cellular component	cytoplasm; polysome; cytosolic ribosome
Biological process	positive regulation of translational initiation in response to starvation; adaptive immune response; negative regulation of neuron differentiation; positive regulation of long-term synaptic potentiation; positive regulation of adaptive immune response; negative regulation of translational initiation in response to stress; negative regulation of translational initiation; phosphorylation; immune system process; cellular response to UV; cellular response to amino acid starvation; negative regulation of CREB transcription factor activity; regulation of feeding behavior; learning; nervous system development; viral translation; neuron projection extension; protein phosphorylation; cellular response to cold; long-term memory; defense response to virus; cellular response to leucine starvation; eiF2alpha phosphorylation in response to endoplasmic reticulum stress; induction by virus of host autophagy; protein autophosphorylation; cell cycle; negative regulation by host of viral genome replication; viral process; regulation of translation; regulation of translational initiation; positive regulation of defense response to virus by host; T cell activation involved in immune response; DNA damage checkpoint signaling; regulation of translational initiation by eIF2 alpha phosphorylation
Sources:Amigo / QuickGO
Orthologs
Databases	NCBI: entry; OMA: entry
Species	Human	Mouse
Entrez	440275	27103
Ensembl	ENSG00000128829	ENSMUSG00000005102
UniProt	Q9P2K8	Q9QZ05
RefSeq (mRNA)	NM_001013703	NM_001177806; NM_013719; NM_001355383
RefSeq (protein)	NP_001013725	NP_001171277; NP_038747; NP_001342312
Location (UCSC)	Chr 15: 39.93 – 40.04 Mb	Chr 2: 118.22 – 118.31 Mb
PubMed search
- Wikidata
View/Edit Human	View/Edit Mouse

Eukaryotic translation initiation factor 2-alpha kinase 4 is an enzyme that in humans is encoded by the EIF2AK4 gene.

EIF2AK4 belongs to a family of kinases that phosphorylate the alpha subunit of eukaryotic translation initiation factor-2 (EIF2S1; MIM 603907) to downregulate protein synthesis in response to varied cellular stresses (Berlanga et al., 1999).[supplied by OMIM]

== See also ==
- Gcn2
