= EIF2S1 =

Protein-coding gene in the species Homo sapiens

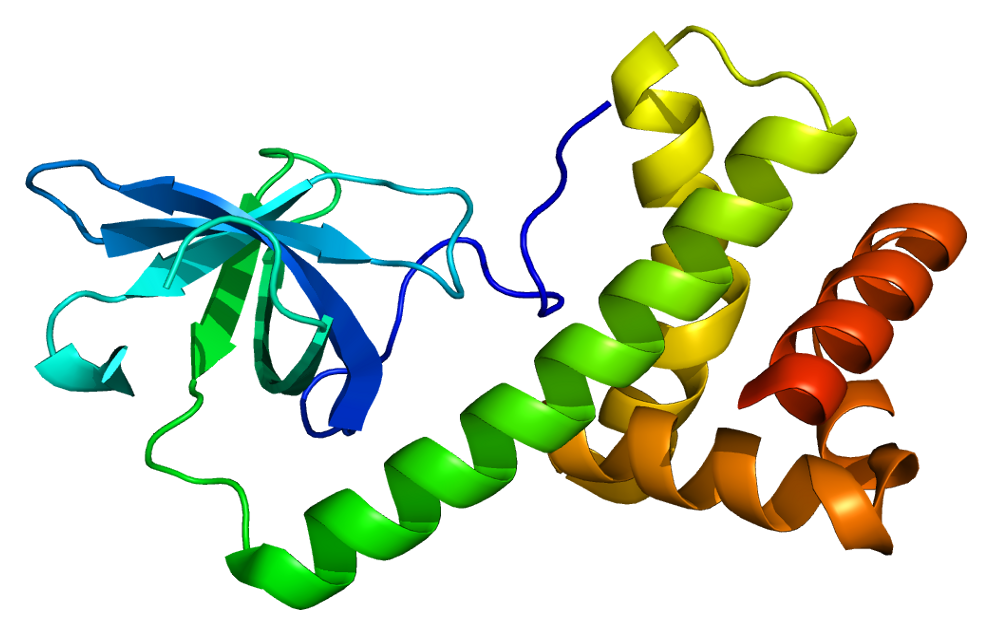

Identifiers
- Aliases: EIF2S1, EIF-2, EIF-2A, EIF-2alpha, EIF2, EIF2A, eukaryotic translation initiation factor 2 subunit alpha
- External IDs: OMIM: 603907; MGI: 95299; GeneCards: EIF2S1
Available structures
PDB	Ortholog search: PDBe RCSB
PDB	List of PDB id codes 1KL9, 1Q8K

Gene location (Human)
Chr.	Chromosome 14 (human)
Band	14q23.3	Start	67,360,328 bp
Band	14q23.3	End	67,386,516 bp

Gene location (Mouse)
Chr.	Chromosome 12 (mouse)
Band	12|12 C3	Start	78,908,593 bp
Band	12|12 C3	End	78,933,784 bp
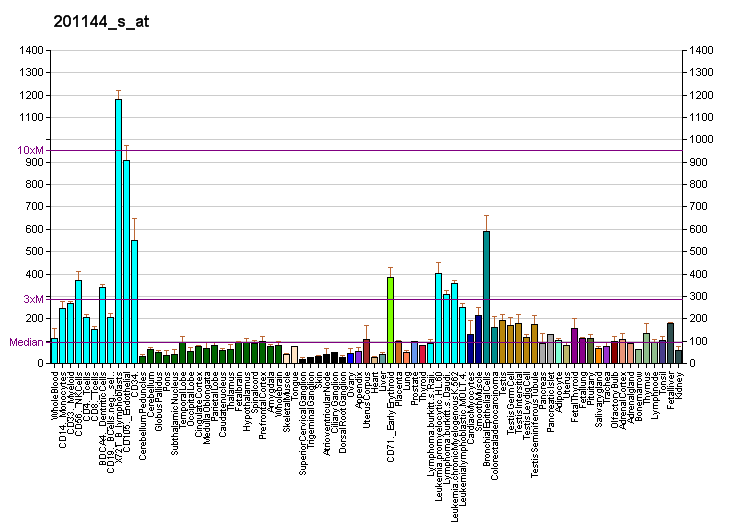

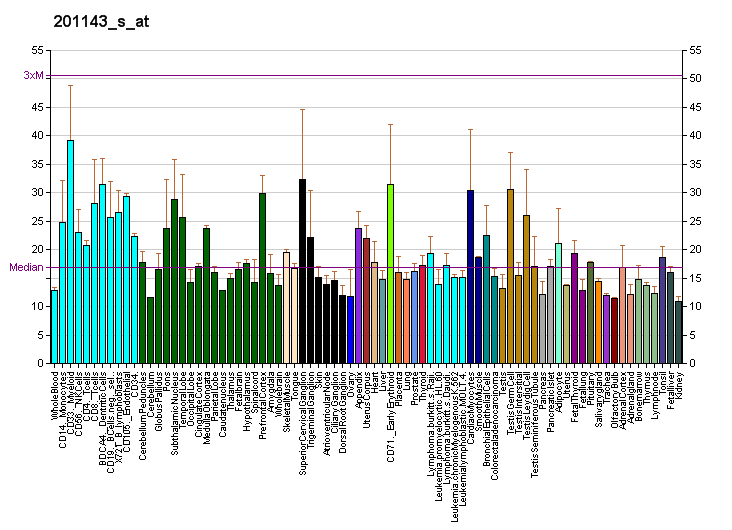

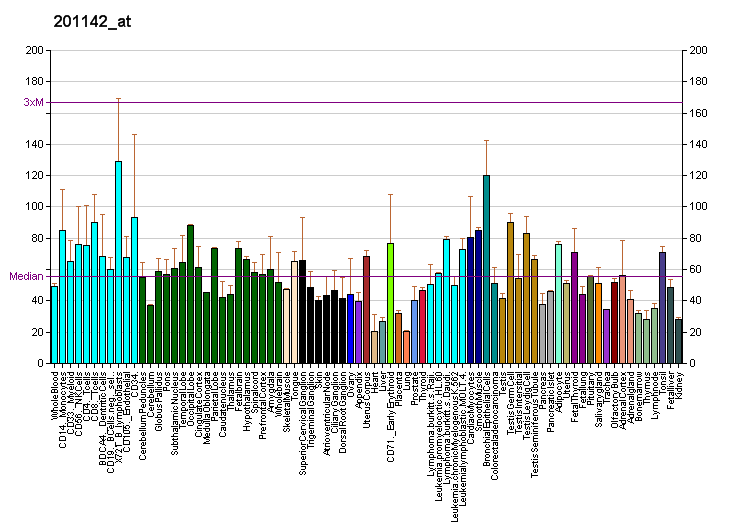
RNA expression pattern
Bgee	Human / Mouse (ortholog); Top expressed in: islet of Langerhans; monocyte; gingival epithelium; gastrocnemius muscle; ganglionic eminence; stromal cell of endometrium; right ventricle; appendix; ventricular zone; body of pancreas / Top expressed in: embryo; embryo; morula; morula; blastocyst; tail of embryo; ventricular zone; genital tubercle; right kidney; corneal stroma; More reference expression data
BioGPS	More reference expression data
Gene ontology
Molecular function	translation initiation factor activity; ribosome binding; protein binding; nucleic acid binding; RNA binding
Cellular component	cytoplasm; eukaryotic 48S preinitiation complex; polysome; cytosol; ribosome; membrane; multi-eIF complex; eukaryotic translation initiation factor 2B complex; glial limiting end-foot; translation initiation ternary complex; cytoplasmic stress granule; extracellular exosome; nucleus; eukaryotic translation initiation factor 2 complex; synapse
Biological process	cellular response to heat; positive regulation of type B pancreatic cell apoptotic process; negative regulation of translational initiation in response to stress; cellular response to UV; cellular response to amino acid starvation; ageing; response to endoplasmic reticulum stress; PERK-mediated unfolded protein response; response to manganese-induced endoplasmic reticulum stress; transmembrane transport; translational initiation; protein autophosphorylation; regulation of translation; regulation of translational initiation in response to stress; negative regulation of guanyl-nucleotide exchange factor activity; positive regulation of neuron death; protein biosynthesis; stress granule assembly; cellular response to oxidative stress
Sources:Amigo / QuickGO
Orthologs
Databases	NCBI: entry; OMA: entry
Species	Human	Mouse
Entrez	1965	13665
Ensembl	ENSG00000134001	ENSMUSG00000021116
UniProt	P05198	Q6ZWX6
RefSeq (mRNA)	NM_004094	NM_026114
RefSeq (protein)	NP_004085	NP_080390
Location (UCSC)	Chr 14: 67.36 – 67.39 Mb	Chr 12: 78.91 – 78.93 Mb
PubMed search
- Wikidata
View/Edit Human	View/Edit Mouse

Eukaryotic translation initiation factor 2 subunit 1 (eIF2α) is a protein that in humans is encoded by the EIF2S1 gene.

== Function ==
The protein encoded by this gene is the alpha (α) subunit of the translation initiation factor eIF2 protein complex which catalyzes an early regulated step of protein synthesis initiation, promoting the binding of the initiator tRNA (Met-tRNA_{i}^{Met}) to 40S ribosomal subunits. Binding occurs as a ternary complex of methionyl-tRNA, eIF2, and GTP. eIF2 is composed of 3 nonidentical subunits, alpha (α, 36 kD, this article), beta (β, 38 kD), and gamma (γ, 52 kD). The rate of formation of the ternary complex is modulated by the phosphorylation state of eIF2α. Phosphorylation of eIF2α by EIF-2 kinases plays a key role in regulating the integrated stress response.

== Clinical significance ==
After reperfusion following brain ischemia, there is inhibition of neuron protein synthesis due to phosphorylation of eIF2α. There is colocalization between phosphorylated eIF2α and cytosolic cytochrome c, which is released from mitochondria in apoptosis. Phosphorylated Eif2-alpha appeared before cytochrome c release, suggesting that phosphorylation of eIF2α triggers cytochrome c release during apoptotic cell death.

Mice heterozygous for the S51A mutation become obese and diabetic on a high-fat diet. Glucose intolerance resulted from reduced insulin secretion, defective transport of proinsulin, and a reduced number of insulin granules in beta cells. Hence proper functioning of eIF2α appears essential for preventing diet-induced type II diabetes.

== Dephosphorylation inhibitors ==
Salubrinal is a selective inhibitor of enzymes that dephosphorylate eIF2α. Salubrinal also blocks eIF2α dephosphorylation by a herpes simplex virus protein and inhibits viral replication. eIF2α phosphorylation is cytoprotective during endoplasmic reticulum stress.

== See also ==
- eIF2
