= EIF2AK1 =

Protein-coding gene in the species Homo sapiens

Identifiers
- Aliases: EIF2AK1, HCR, HRI, eukaryotic translation initiation factor 2 alpha kinase 1, LEMSPAD, hHRI
- External IDs: OMIM: 613635; MGI: 1353448; GeneCards: EIF2AK1
Enzyme activity
EC #	BRENDA	ExPASy	KEGG	MetaCyc
2.7.11.1	↗	↗	↗	↗

Gene location (Human)
Chr.	Chromosome 7 (human)
Band	7p22.1	Start	6,022,247 bp
Band	7p22.1	End	6,059,175 bp

Gene location (Mouse)
Chr.	Chromosome 5 (mouse)
Band	5|5 G2	Start	143,803,543 bp
Band	5|5 G2	End	143,841,069 bp
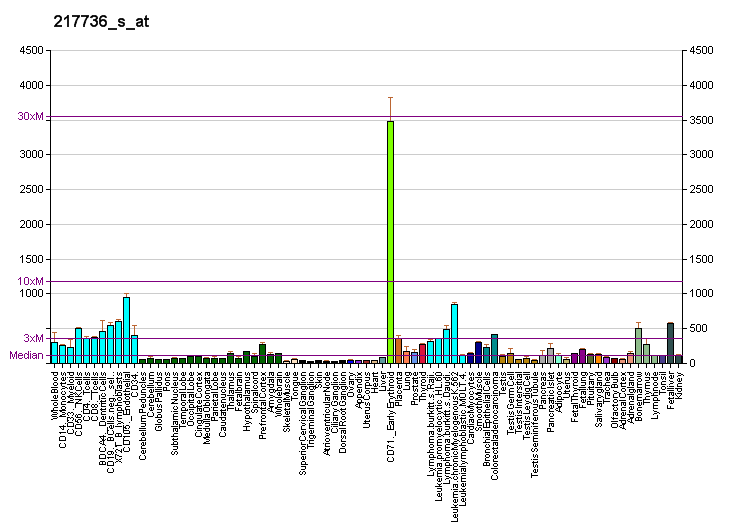

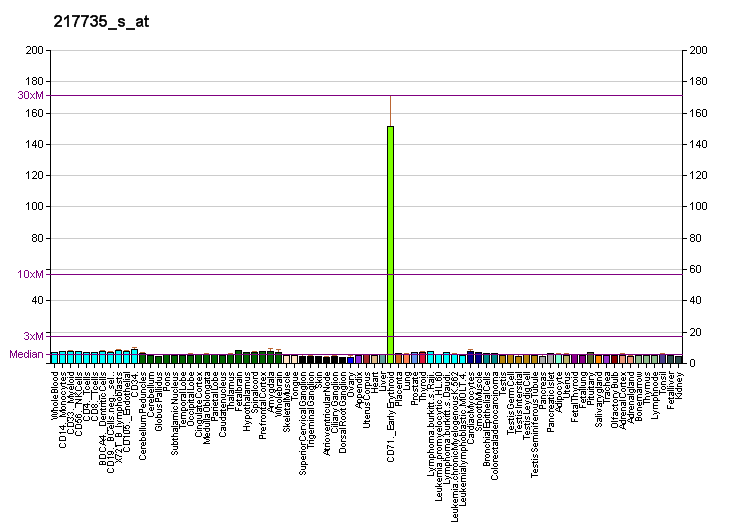
RNA expression pattern
Bgee	Human / Mouse (ortholog); Top expressed in: trabecular bone; monocyte; parotid gland; islet of Langerhans; ventricular zone; bone marrow; mucosa of ileum; bone marrow cell; stromal cell of endometrium; rectum / Top expressed in: fetal liver hematopoietic progenitor cell; secondary oocyte; tibiofemoral joint; maxillary prominence; mandibular prominence; bone marrow; primary oocyte; right kidney; tail of embryo; epithelium of stomach; More reference expression data
BioGPS	More reference expression data
Gene ontology
Molecular function	transferase activity; nucleotide binding; protein kinase activity; kinase activity; protein serine/threonine kinase activity; ATP binding; heme binding; protein homodimerization activity; eukaryotic translation initiation factor 2alpha kinase activity; translation initiation factor activity
Cellular component	cytoplasm
Biological process	negative regulation of translation; phosphorylation; regulation of hemoglobin biosynthetic process; iron ion homeostasis; macrophage differentiation; protein phosphorylation; regulation of translational initiation by eIF2 alpha phosphorylation; acute inflammatory response; protoporphyrinogen IX metabolic process; regulation of eIF2 alpha phosphorylation by heme; phagocytosis; negative regulation of translational initiation by iron; regulation of translation; negative regulation of cell population proliferation; protein autophosphorylation; negative regulation of hemoglobin biosynthetic process; response to iron ion starvation; translational initiation
Sources:Amigo / QuickGO
Orthologs
Databases	NCBI: entry; OMA: entry
Species	Human	Mouse
Entrez	27102	15467
Ensembl	ENSG00000086232	ENSMUSG00000029613
UniProt	Q9BQI3	Q9Z2R9
RefSeq (mRNA)	NM_014413; NM_001134335	NM_013557
RefSeq (protein)	NP_001127807; NP_055228; NP_055228.2	NP_038585
Location (UCSC)	Chr 7: 6.02 – 6.06 Mb	Chr 5: 143.8 – 143.84 Mb
PubMed search
- Wikidata
View/Edit Human	View/Edit Mouse

Eukaryotic translation initiation factor 2-alpha kinase 1 is an enzyme that in humans is encoded by the EIF2AK1 gene.

== Function ==
EIF2AK1 inhibits protein synthesis at the translation initiation level, in response to various stress conditions, including oxidative stress, heme deficiency, osmotic shock and heat shock. EIF2AK1 exerts its function through the phosphorylation of EIF2S1 at 'Ser-48' and 'Ser-51', thus preventing its recycling. Binds hemin forming a 1:1 complex through a cysteine thiolate and histidine nitrogenous coordination. This binding occurs with moderate affinity, allowing it to sense the heme concentration within the cell. Owing to this unique heme-sensing capacity, it plays a crucial role in shutting off protein synthesis during acute heme-deficient conditions. In red blood cells (RBCs), it controls hemoglobin synthesis ensuring a coordinated regulation of the synthesis of the heme and globin moieties of hemoglobin. Thus plays an essential protective role for RBC survival in anemias of iron deficiency. EIF2AK1 also act to moderate ER stress during acute heme-deficient conditions.

== Enzymology ==
EIF2AK1 is a kinase, thus it catalyses the following reaction:

ATP + a protein = ADP + a phosphoprotein

EIF2AK1 is induced by acute heme depletion, that not only increases EIF2AK1 protein levels, but also stimulates kinase activity by autophosphorylation. Inhibited by the heme-degradation products biliverdin and bilirubin. Induced by oxidative stress generated by arsenite treatment. Binding of nitric oxide (NO) to the heme iron in the N-terminal heme-binding domain activates the kinase activity, while binding of carbon monoxide (CO) suppresses kinase activity.

cite:https://www.uniprot.org/uniprot/Q9BQI3 The HRI gene is localized to 7p22 where its 3' end slightly overlaps the 3' end of the gene JTV1. The two genes are transcribed from opposite strands. Studies in rat and rabbit suggest that the HRI gene product phosphorylates the alpha subunit of eukaryotic initiation factor 2. Its kinase activity is induced by low levels of heme and inhibited by the presence of heme.
