= FGFR1OP2 =

Novel gene

Identifiers
- Aliases: FGFR1OP2, HSPC123-like, WIT3.0, FGFR1 oncogene partner 2
- External IDs: OMIM: 608858; MGI: 1914779; GeneCards: FGFR1OP2

Gene location (Human)
Chr.	Chromosome 12 (human)
Band	12p11.23	Start	26,938,470 bp
Band	12p11.23	End	26,966,650 bp

Gene location (Mouse)
Chr.	Chromosome 6 (mouse)
Band	6|6 G3	Start	146,478,701 bp
Band	6|6 G3	End	146,500,696 bp
RNA expression pattern
Bgee	Human / Mouse (ortholog); Top expressed in: Achilles tendon; monocyte; left ovary; right ovary; secondary oocyte; corpus callosum; Brodmann area 9; lymph node; C1 segment; pancreatic epithelial cell / Top expressed in: ascending aorta; aortic valve; granulocyte; blood; superior surface of tongue; lacrimal gland; mesenteric lymph nodes; thymus; sternocleidomastoid muscle; triceps brachii muscle; More reference expression data
BioGPS	n/a
Gene ontology
Molecular function	protein binding; protein homodimerization activity; protein tyrosine kinase activity
Cellular component	cytoplasm; cytosol
Biological process	wound healing; response to wounding; peptidyl-tyrosine phosphorylation
Sources:Amigo / QuickGO
Orthologs
Databases	NCBI: entry; OMA: entry
Species	Human	Mouse
Entrez	26127	67529
Ensembl	ENSG00000111790	ENSMUSG00000040242
UniProt	Q9NVK5	Q9CRA9
RefSeq (mRNA)	NM_015633; NM_001171887; NM_001171888	NM_026218; NM_001347513
RefSeq (protein)	NP_001165358; NP_001165359; NP_056448	NP_001334442; NP_080494
Location (UCSC)	Chr 12: 26.94 – 26.97 Mb	Chr 6: 146.48 – 146.5 Mb
PubMed search
- Wikidata
View/Edit Human	View/Edit Mouse

FGFR1 oncogene partner 2 (FGFR1OP2) is a protein that in humans is encoded by the gene FGFR1OP2. It was identified in a study on myeloproliferative syndrome (EMS). The study aimed to identify the partner genes to the fibroblast growth factor receptor 1 (FGFR1) involved in the syndrome. Using the 5'-RACE PCR technique, FGFR1OP2 was identified as a novel gene with no known function.

== Function ==
FGFR1OP2, when fused with the fibroblast growth factor receptor 1 (FGFR1), is shown to cause myeloproliferative syndrome. The protein encoded by the FGFR1 gene belongs to the fibroblast growth factor receptor family. FGFRs usually contain an extracellular ligand binding domain, a single transmembrane domain, and an intracellular tyrosine kinase domain. The extracellular domain specifies which ligand the receptor will bind to and mediates ligand-induced receptor dimerization. When FGFR1OP2 is fused to FGFR1, it may exhibit constitutive kinase activity. Furthermore, FGFR1OP2 is possibly involved in some steps of the wound healing pathway.

== Evolutionary Biology ==
The following tables compare the Homo sapiens FGFR1OP2 gene and protein to orthologs. In both of the following tables, the divergence from the Homo sapiens FGFR1OP2 gene or protein to the ortholog was found using TimeTree. Ortholog mRNA and protein sequences were found using NCBI's BLAST and UCSC's BLAT Tool. The accession numbers, as well as the sequence length and the sequence similarity were compiled using BLAST.

mRNA orthologs to Homo sapiens FGFR1OP2 mRNA
Genus species	Common name	Divergence (MYA)	Accession number	Sequence length (base pairs)	Sequence similarity
Homo sapiens	Human	0	NP_056448.1	3030	100%
Nomascus leucogenys	Gibbon	20.4	XM_003265627.1	3020	96%
Bos taurus	Cow	94.2	BC148973.1	2616	94%
Canis lupus familiaris	Dog	94.2	NM_001197313.1	694	94%
Loxodonta africana	Elephant	98.7	XM_003405700.1	762	93%
Sciurus vulgaris	Squirrel	92.3	NA	1859	92%
Mus musculus	Mouse	92.3	NM_026218.2	2828	89%
Rattus norvegicus	Rat	92.3	NM_201421.1	2860	88%
Monodelphis domestica	Opossum	162.6	XM_001362357.1	765	88%
Taeniopygia guttata	Zebra finch	296	XM_002194575.2	1071	85%
Gallus gallus	Chicken	296	NM_001007855.1	3142	83%
Meleagris gallopavo	Turkey	296	XM_003202514.1	1275	82%
Anolis carolinensis	Anole	296	XM_003221530.1	1964	82%
Trichechus inunguis	Manatee	98.7	NA	2752	81%
Oreochromis niloticus	Tilapia	400.1	XM_003455706.1	937	79%
Xenopus laevis	Frog	371.2	NM_001085932.1	1279	79%
Danio rerio	Zebrafish	400.1	NM_199955	1501	78%

The mRNA orthologs sequence similarity to Homo sapiens FGFR1OP2 was graphed as a function of time in order to show how the FGFR1OP2 gene has changed over time. The graph is depicted on the right.

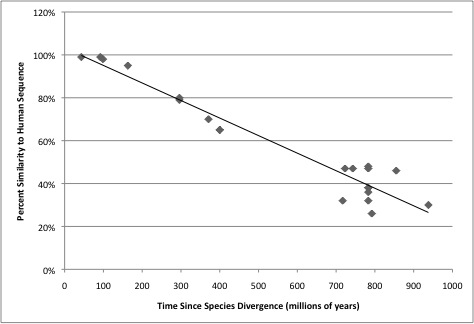
This graph shows the FGFR1OP2 mRNA sequence identity (% to human) vs. the time since the species diverged (in millions of years) from humans for the mRNA orthologs.

The table below shows the protein orthologs to the Homo sapiens FGFR1OP2 protein. FGFR1OP2 is conserved in all clades of the animal kingdom, as seen in the table below.

Protein orthologs to Homo sapiens FGFR1OP2
Genus species	Common name	Divergence (MYA)	Accession number	Sequence length (amino acids)	Sequence similarity
Homo sapiens	Human	0	NP_056448.1	253	100%
Saimiri boliviensis boliviensis	Squirrel monkey	42.6	XP_003926645.1	253	99%
Loxodonta africana	Elephant	98.7	XP_003405748.1	253	99%
Mus musculus	Mouse	92.3	NP_080494.1	253	99%
Monodelphis domestica	Opossum	162.6	XP_001362394.1	254	96%
Meleagris gallopavo	Turkey	296	XP_003202562.1	215	83%
Anolis carolinensis	Anole	296	XP_003221578.1	214	82%
Oreochromis niloticus	Tilapia	400.1	XP_003455754.1	224	78%
Xenopus laevis	Frog	371.2	NP_001079401.1	215	77%
Danio rerio	Zebrafish	400.1	NP_956249.1	215	77%
Strongylocentrotus purpuratus	Sea urchin	742.9	XP_786805.2	250	66%
Crassostrea gigas	Oyster	782.7	EKC25301.1	233	64%
Capitella teleta	Annelid	782.7	ELU02494.1	287	63%
Nematostella vectensis	Sea anemone	855.3	XP_001639733.1	174	62%
Ciona intestinalis	Sea squirt	722.5	XP_002130340.1	236	61%
Tribolium castaneum	Beetle	782.7	XP_974301.1	201	57%
Loa loa	Nematode	937.5	EFO20048.2	266	51%
Schistosoma mansoni	Blood fluke	792.4	CCD58880.1	342	51%
Amphimedon queenslandica	Sponge	716.5	XP_003387498.1	221	48%

== Gene ==
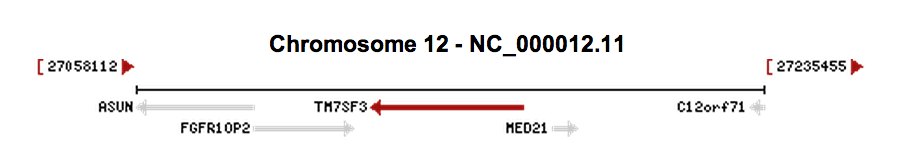
ASUN is located downstream and TM7SF3 is located slightly upstream from the FGFR1OP2 gene locus.

There are three transcript variants for the FGFR1OP2 gene, with the first being the longest. FGFR1OP2 is also known as HSPC123-like protein (HSPC123L) and wound inducible transcript 3.0 (wit3.0).

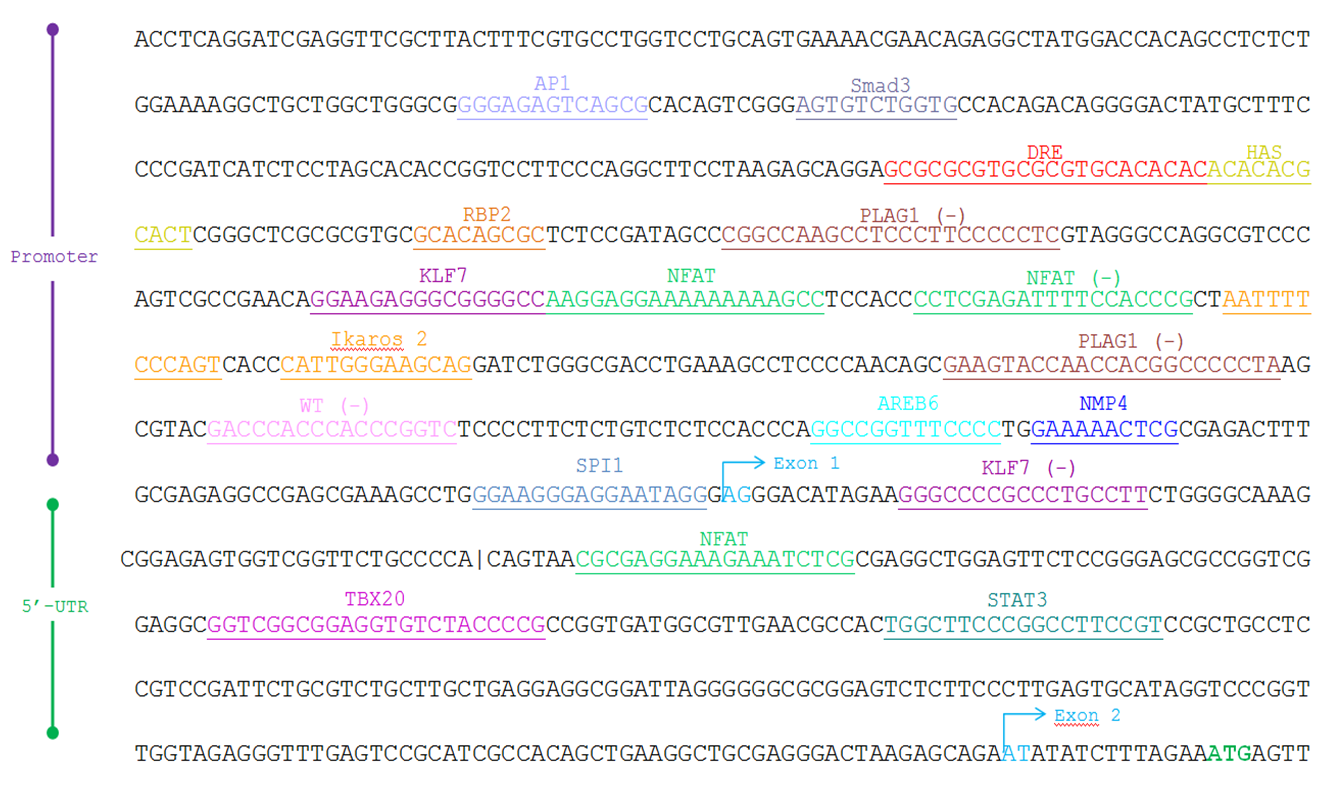
The promoter region of the Homo sapiens FGFR1OP2 gene shown with likely binding sites for transcription factors. ElDorado was used to analyze the promoter of FGFR1OP2, and the most likely binding transcription factors are shown.

=== Locus ===
The Homo sapiens FGFR1OP2 gene is located on chromosome 12, with its specific locus being 12p11.23. The Homo sapiens asunder spermatogenesis regulator (ASUN) gene (NCBI Reference Sequence NM_018164.2) is located directly upstream from FGFR1OP2. The ASUN gene is a regulator of development and the mitotic cell cycle. The Homo sapiens transmembrane 7 superfamily member 3 (TM7SF3) gene is located slightly downstream from FGFR1OP2.

=== Promoter ===
Transcription factors that bind to the FGFR1OP2 promoter
Transcription factor (T.F.)	Full name	Function	Matrix similarity	Strand T.F. binds	Sequence T.F. binds
AP1	Activator protein 1	Differentiation, proliferation, apoptosis	0.874	+	gggaGAGTcagcg
Smad3	Mothers against decapentaplegic homolog 3	TGF-beta signaling factor	0.983	+	agtGTCTggtg
DRE	Dioxin response element	Bound by AHR/AHRNT heterodimer	0.971	+	gcgcgcgtgcGCGTgcacacacaca
HAS	HIF-1 ancillary sequence	Induce vascular endothelial growth	0.923	+	acaCACGcact
RBP2	Retinoblastoma-binding protein 2	Demethylase	1.000	+	GCACagcgc
PLAG1	Pleomorphic adenoma gene 1	Cell proliferation	1.000	-	gaGGGGgaagggaggcttggccg
KLF7	Kruppel-like factor 7	Regulate cell proliferation, differentiation, and survival	0.972	+	ggaagagGGCGgggcca
NFAT	Nuclear factor of activated T-cells	Immune response	0.994	+	aaggaGGAAaaaaaaagcc
NFAT	Nuclear factor of activated T-cells	Immune response	0.955	-	cgggtGGAAaatctcgagg
Ikaros2	Ikaros zinc finger	Potential regulator of lymphocytes	0.986	+	cattGGGAagcag
Ikaros2	Ikaros zinc finger	Potential regulator of lymphocytes	0.980	-	gactGGGAaaatt
PLAG1	Pleomorphic adenoma gene 1	Cell proliferation	1.000	-	taGGGGgccgtggttggtacttc
WT	Wilms tumor suppressor	EGR/nerve growth factor	0.948	-	gaccgggTGGGtgggtc
AREB6	Atp1a1 regulatory element binding factor 6	Negative regulator of IL-2	0.982	+	ggccgGTTTcccc
NMP4	Nuclear matrix protein 4	Cas-interacting zinc finger protein	0.994	+	ggAAAAactcg
SPI1	SPI-1 proto-oncogene	Hematopoietic transcription factor	0.918	+	ggaagggaGGAAtagg
KLF7	Kruppel-like factor 7	Regulate cell proliferation, differentiation, and survival	0.962	-	aaggcagGGCGgggccc
NFAT	Nuclear factor of activated T-cells	Immune response	0.989	+	cgcgaGGAAagaaatctcg
TBX20	Brachyury gene	Mesoderm developmental factor	1.000	+	ggtcggcggAGGTgtctaccccg
STAT3	Signal transducer and activator of transcription 3	Activate transcription	0.940	+	tggcTTCCcggccttccgt

== Protein ==
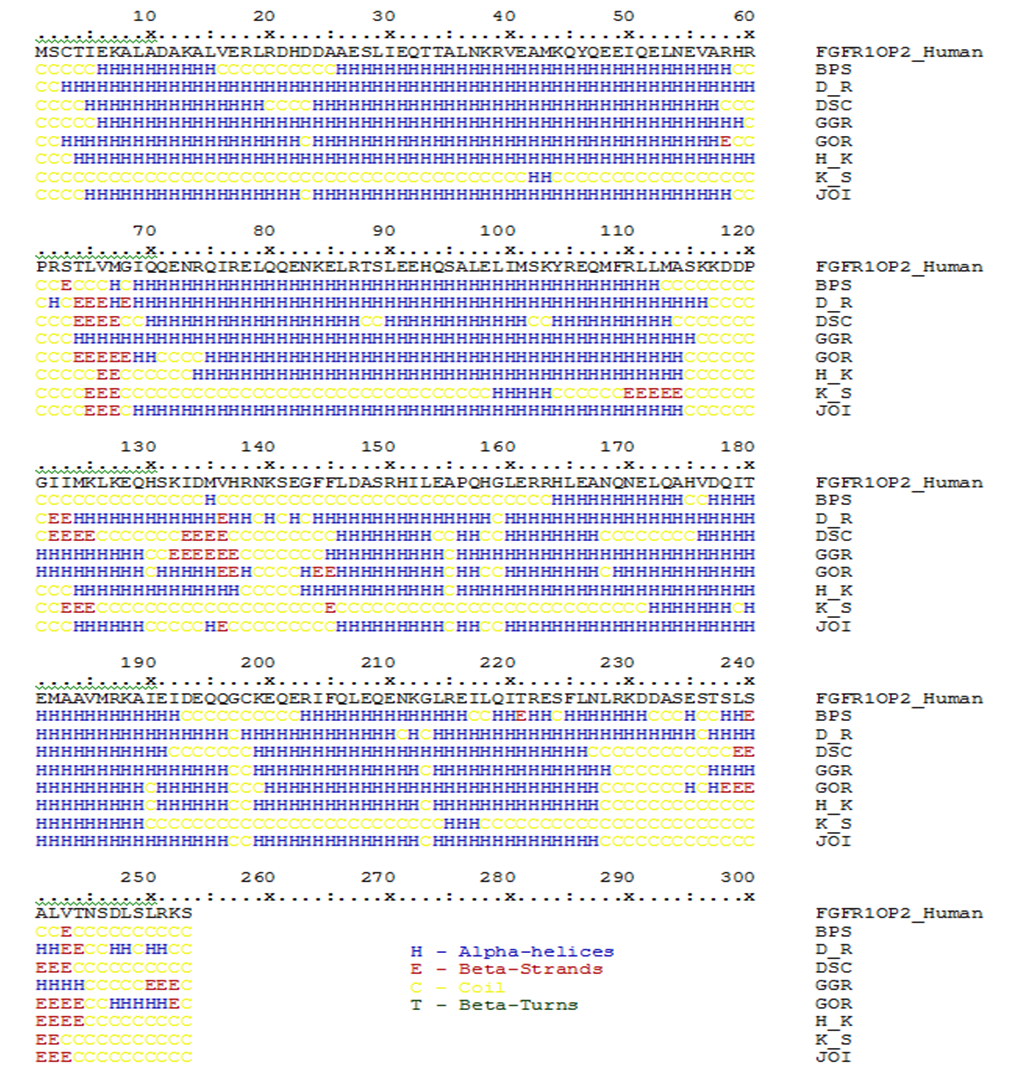
The protein sequence of FGFR1OP2 was analyzed using PELE, and appears to be made up of mostly alpha helices.

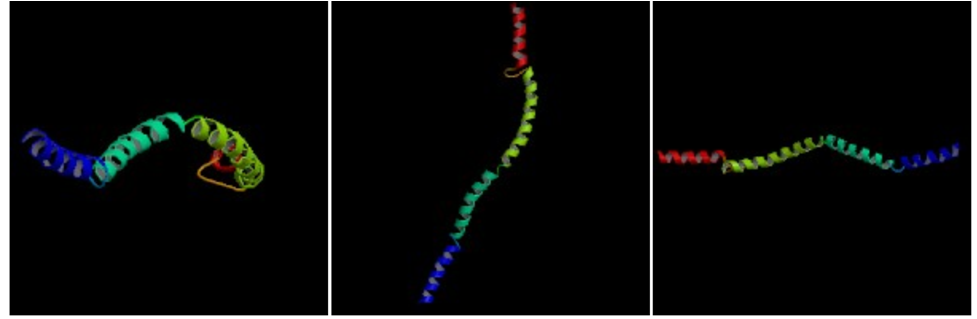
Mus musculus FGFR1OP2 protein structure from ModBase

There are three isoforms of the FGFR1OP2 protein. Transcript variant 1 consists of 253 amino acids and weighs 29.4 kilodaltons. FGFR1OP2's isoelectric point is 5.61. The FGFR1OP2 protein does not have a signal sequences, and therefore is not secreted.

=== Domains ===
FGFR1OP2 has a domain of unknown function, designated DUF837.

=== Protein Structure ===
Using the PELE program of Biology WorkBench the protein sequence of FGFR1OP2 was analyzed, and FGFR1OP2 appears to be completely composed of alpha helices. No structural models for the Homo sapiens FGFR1OP2 protein could be found, but the Mus musculus FGFR1OP2 protein's structure can be seen below.

== Expression ==
The expression of FGFR1OP2 was analyzed via the Gene Expression Omnibus at NCBI. The following are findings from the Gene Expression Onmibus database:

- There is a slightly elevated expression level of FGFR1OP2 in pulmonary sarcoidosis, suggesting FGFR1OP2 operates in part of the wound healing pathway.
- FGFR1OP2 is strongly upregulated when compared to the control in an increased immune response triggered by the VAF347 ligand. FGFR1OP2 is upregulated in the monocyte derived dendritic cell response to the VAF347 ligand. VAF347 activates the aryl hydrocarbon receptor and acts on monocytes and naive CD4+ Th cells to promote development of IL-22 secreting Th cells.
- Langerhans cells show decreased expression of FGFR1OP2 with the null aryl hydrocarbon receptor (ligand is VAF347) in Mus musculus.
- The gene is also highly expressed compared to control samples in monocytopenia.
- It is expressed in cases of leukemia; it may have a linkage to the disease.
- FGFR1OP2 shows low expression levels in septic splenocytes in Mus musculus.
- FGFR1OP2 is expressed in fetal reticulocytes but not adult reticulocytes, suggesting it may play a role in the development of red blood cells.

FGFR1OP2 GEO Profiles
Condition or cell	GEO Profile	Condition or cell	GEO Profile
Pulmonary sarcoidosis	There is a slightly elevated expression level of FGFR1OP2 in pulmonary sarcoidosis.	Monocyte-derived dendritic cell response to VAF347 ligand	
Langerhan cells	FGFR1OP2 shows decreased expression in Langerhan cells in Mus musculus.	Autosomal dominant monocytopenia	FGFR1OP2 expression in autosomal dominant monocytopenia.
Septic splenocytes	FGFR1OP2 shows low expression in septic splenocytes	Fetal and adult reticulocytes	FGFR1OP2 expression differs among fetal and adult reticulocytes.

== Interactions ==
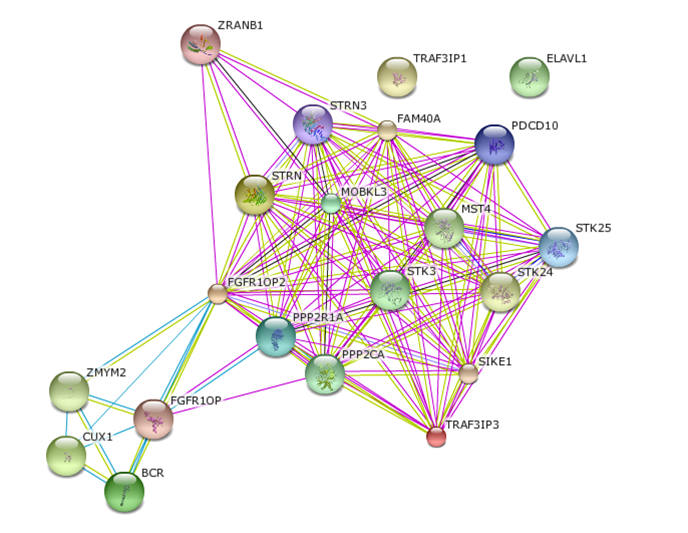
FGFR1OP2 interacting proteins

Using the STRING database and Gene Cards, proteins that possibly interact with FGFR1OP2 were identified, and they are shown in the table below.

FGFR1OP2 Interacting Proteins
Interactant	Full name	Function	Source(s)
STK24	Serine/threonine kinase 24	Protein kinase	Gene Cards
TRAF3IP3	TRAF3 interacting protein	Adapter molecule	Gene Cards, STRING
ZRANB1	Zinc finger, RAN-binding domain containing 1	Positive regulator of Wnt signaling, cytoskeletal organization	Gene Cards
PPP2R1A	Protein phosphatase 2	Negative control of cell growth and division	Gene Cards
STRN	Striatin, calmodulin binding protein	Scaffold protein	Gene Cards, STRING
FAM40A	Family with sequence similarity 40, member A	Cytoskeletal organization	STRING
PDCD10	Programmed cell death 10	Regulate apoptotic pathways	STRING
STK26	Serine/threonine kinase 26	Mediator of cell growth	STRING
SIKE1	Suppressor of IKBKE1	Suppressor of IKK-epsilon and TBK1 inhibitor	STRING
MOBKL3	Mps one binder kinase activator-like 3	Spindle pole body duplication and mitotic checkpoint regulation	STRING

== Clinical Significance ==
Single-nucleotide polymorphisms (SNPs) in the FGFR1OP2 gene were found to lead to edentulism in the mandible of a small Korean population (134 subjects aged 60–80 years). Also, when FGFR1OP2 is fused to FGFR1, 8p11 myeloproliferative syndrome can result.
