= CCM3 =

PDCD10 can refer to:

- Sevogle Airport
- an alternate name for PDCD10
