= PPP2CA =

Protein-coding gene in humans

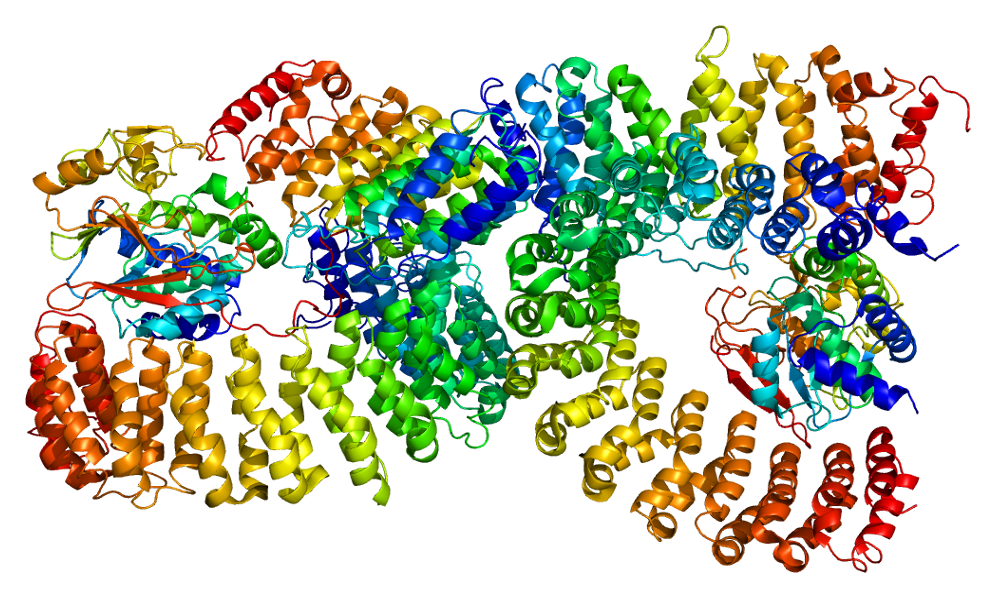

Identifiers
- Aliases: PPP2CA, PP2Ac, PP2CA, PP2Calpha, RP-C, protein phosphatase 2 catalytic subunit alpha, NEDLBA
- External IDs: OMIM: 176915; MGI: 1321159; GeneCards: PPP2CA
Available structures
PDB	Ortholog search: PDBe RCSB
PDB	List of PDB id codes 2IAE, 2IE3, 2IE4, 2NPP, 2NYL, 2NYM, 3C5W, 3DW8, 3FGA, 3K7V, 3K7W, 3P71, 4I5L, 4I5N, 4IYP, 4LAC
Enzyme activity
EC #	BRENDA	ExPASy	KEGG	MetaCyc
3.1.3.16	↗	↗	↗	↗

Gene location (Human)
Chr.	Chromosome 5 (human)
Band	5q31.1	Start	134,194,332 bp
Band	5q31.1	End	134,226,073 bp

Gene location (Mouse)
Chr.	Chromosome 11 (mouse)
Band	11|11 B1.3	Start	51,989,508 bp
Band	11|11 B1.3	End	52,018,605 bp
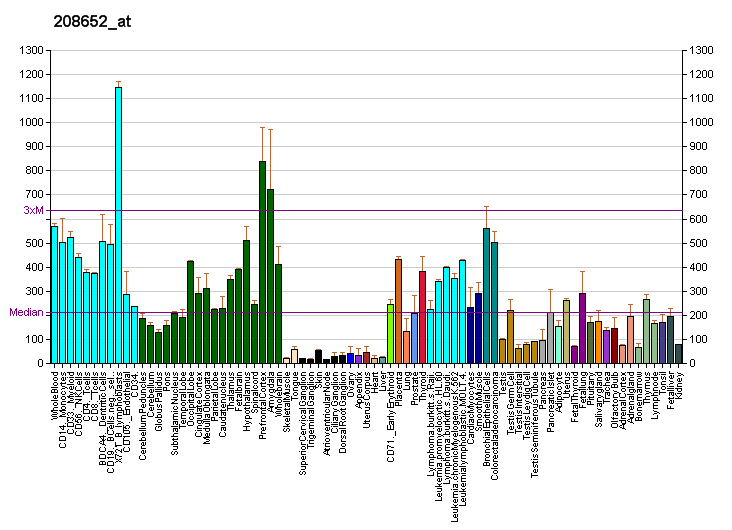
RNA expression pattern
Bgee	Human / Mouse (ortholog); Top expressed in: lateral nuclear group of thalamus; ventricular zone; ganglionic eminence; stromal cell of endometrium; Skeletal muscle tissue of rectus abdominis; postcentral gyrus; prefrontal cortex; pars compacta; pons; right ventricle / Top expressed in: medial ganglionic eminence; molar; nucleus accumbens; substantia nigra; endocardial cushion; barrel cortex; atrioventricular valve; dorsal striatum; abdominal wall; human fetus; More reference expression data
BioGPS	More reference expression data
Gene ontology
Molecular function	phosphoprotein phosphatase activity; GABA receptor binding; metal ion binding; protein C-terminus binding; protein binding; hydrolase activity; protein heterodimerization activity; protein serine/threonine phosphatase activity; tau protein binding
Cellular component	cytoplasm; cytosol; spindle pole; membrane; microtubule cytoskeleton; plasma membrane; protein phosphatase type 2A complex; chromosome; mitochondrion; chromosome, centromeric region; cytoskeleton; extracellular exosome; nucleus; membrane raft; synapse
Biological process	apoptotic process; regulation of transcription, DNA-templated; ceramide metabolic process; regulation of DNA replication; protein dephosphorylation; response to organic substance; positive regulation of protein serine/threonine kinase activity; regulation of Wnt signaling pathway; regulation of cell adhesion; meiosis; negative regulation of cell growth; RNA splicing; regulation of cell differentiation; regulation of growth; mitotic nuclear membrane reassembly; nuclear-transcribed mRNA catabolic process, nonsense-mediated decay; mesoderm development; second-messenger-mediated signaling; negative regulation of epithelial to mesenchymal transition; negative regulation of tyrosine phosphorylation of STAT protein; regulation of protein phosphorylation; response to lead ion; peptidyl-threonine dephosphorylation; peptidyl-serine dephosphorylation; regulation of microtubule binding; positive regulation of microtubule binding
Sources:Amigo / QuickGO
Orthologs
Databases	NCBI: entry; OMA: entry
Species	Human	Mouse
Entrez	5515	19052
Ensembl	ENSG00000113575	ENSMUSG00000020349
UniProt	P67775	P63330
RefSeq (mRNA)	NM_002715; NM_001355019	NM_019411
RefSeq (protein)	NP_002706; NP_001341948	NP_062284
Location (UCSC)	Chr 5: 134.19 – 134.23 Mb	Chr 11: 51.99 – 52.02 Mb
PubMed search
- Wikidata
View/Edit Human	View/Edit Mouse

Serine/threonine-protein phosphatase 2A catalytic subunit alpha isoform is an enzyme that (in humans) is encoded by the PPP2CA gene.

== Function ==
This gene encodes the phosphatase 2A catalytic subunit. Protein phosphatase 2A is one of the four major Ser/Thr phosphatases, and it is implicated in the negative control of cell growth and division. It consists of a common heteromeric core enzyme, which is composed of a catalytic subunit and a constant regulatory subunit, that associates with a variety of regulatory subunits. This gene encodes an alpha isoform of the catalytic subunit.

== Role in human pathology ==
Genetic ablation of the PP2A catalytic subunit PPP2CA or depletion of the regulatory subunit PP2A-B56α induced senescence in Medulloblastoma models.

PPP2CA may serve as an immunotherapy target. Coculture experiments demonstrate PPP2CA deficiency in glioma cells promotes dendritic cell presentation. This may benefit immunologically cold tumors. In vivo experiments have show PPP2CA depletion can sensitize tumors and potentially allow for immune checkpoint inhibitors and radiotherapy to become more effective.

== Interactions ==
PPP2CA has been shown to interact with:

- Bcl-2,
- Bestrophin 1,
- CCNG2,
- CTTNBP2NL,
- CTTNBP2,
- Cyclin-dependent kinase 2,
- Cyclin-dependent kinase 6,
- FAM40A,
- IGBP1,
- MOBKL3,
- PPP2R1A,
- PPP2R1B,
- PPP2R2A,
- PPP2R3B,
- PPP2R5A,
- PPP2R5B,
- PPP2R5C,
- PPP2R5D,
- PPP2R5E,
- STRN3,
- STRN, and
- TLX1.

== See also ==
- PPP2CB
