= STK25 =

Protein-coding gene in the species Homo sapiens

Identifiers
- Aliases: STK25, SOK1, YSK1, serine/threonine kinase 25
- External IDs: OMIM: 602255; MGI: 1891699; GeneCards: STK25
Available structures
PDB	Ortholog search: PDBe RCSB
PDB	List of PDB id codes 2XIK, 3W8H, 4NZW
Enzyme activity
EC #	BRENDA	ExPASy	KEGG	MetaCyc
2.7.11.1	↗	↗	↗	↗

Gene location (Human)
Chr.	Chromosome 2 (human)
Band	2q37.3	Start	241,492,670 bp
Band	2q37.3	End	241,509,730 bp

Gene location (Mouse)
Chr.	Chromosome 1 (mouse)
Band	1 D|1 47.25 cM	Start	93,547,473 bp
Band	1 D|1 47.25 cM	End	93,586,381 bp
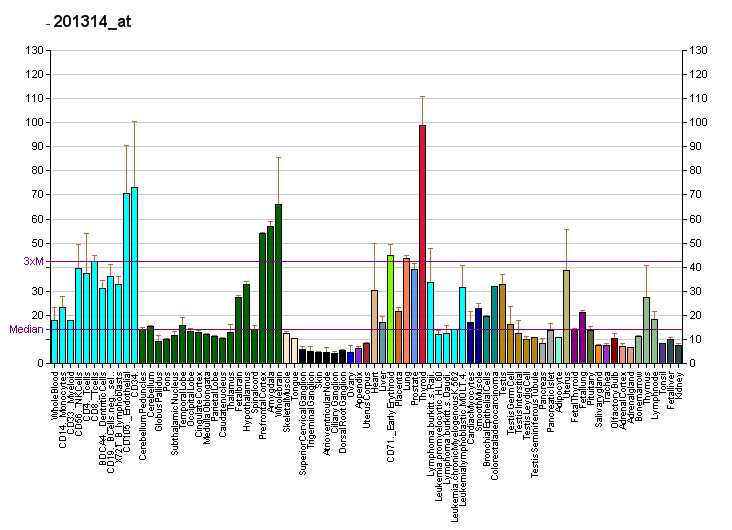
RNA expression pattern
Bgee	Human / Mouse (ortholog); Top expressed in: muscle of thigh; right lobe of thyroid gland; right hemisphere of cerebellum; gastrocnemius muscle; left lobe of thyroid gland; right frontal lobe; apex of heart; ventricular zone; anterior pituitary; ganglionic eminence / Top expressed in: spermatocyte; dentate gyrus of hippocampal formation granule cell; neural layer of retina; spermatid; superior frontal gyrus; ventricular zone; genital tubercle; muscle of thigh; right ventricle; tail of embryo; More reference expression data
BioGPS	More reference expression data
Gene ontology
Molecular function	transferase activity; protein kinase activity; nucleotide binding; protein homodimerization activity; metal ion binding; kinase activity; protein binding; ATP binding; protein serine/threonine kinase activity; MAP kinase kinase kinase kinase activity
Cellular component	cytoplasm; Golgi apparatus; Golgi membrane; extracellular exosome
Biological process	intrinsic apoptotic signaling pathway in response to hydrogen peroxide; phosphorylation; response to oxidative stress; positive regulation of axonogenesis; establishment of Golgi localization; Golgi reassembly; establishment or maintenance of cell polarity; protein phosphorylation; Golgi localization; protein autophosphorylation; response to hydrogen peroxide; signal transduction; positive regulation of stress-activated MAPK cascade; MAPK cascade; regulation of mitotic cell cycle; regulation of apoptotic process; neuron projection morphogenesis; stress-activated protein kinase signaling cascade; activation of protein kinase activity
Sources:Amigo / QuickGO
Orthologs
Databases	NCBI: entry; OMA: entry
Species	Human	Mouse
Entrez	10494	59041
Ensembl	ENSG00000115694	ENSMUSG00000026277
UniProt	O00506	Q9Z2W1
RefSeq (mRNA)	NM_001271977; NM_001271978; NM_001271979; NM_001271980; NM_001282305 NM_001282306; NM_001282307; NM_001282308; NM_006374	NM_021537
RefSeq (protein)	NP_001258906; NP_001258907; NP_001258908; NP_001258909; NP_001269234 NP_001269235; NP_001269236; NP_001269237; NP_006365	NP_067512
Location (UCSC)	Chr 2: 241.49 – 241.51 Mb	Chr 1: 93.55 – 93.59 Mb
PubMed search
- Wikidata
View/Edit Human	View/Edit Mouse

Serine/threonine-protein kinase 25 is an enzyme that in humans is encoded by the STK25 gene.

== Interactions ==
STK25 has been shown to interact with STRN, PDCD10 and MOBKL3.
