= PPP2R5B =

Protein-coding gene in the species Homo sapiens

Identifiers
- Aliases: PPP2R5B, B56B, PR61B, protein phosphatase 2 regulatory subunit B'beta, B56beta
- External IDs: OMIM: 601644; MGI: 2388480; GeneCards: PPP2R5B

Gene location (Human)
Chr.	Chromosome 11 (human)
Band	11q13.1	Start	64,917,553 bp
Band	11q13.1	End	64,934,475 bp

Gene location (Mouse)
Chr.	Chromosome 19 (mouse)
Band	19|19 A	Start	6,277,795 bp
Band	19|19 A	End	6,285,902 bp
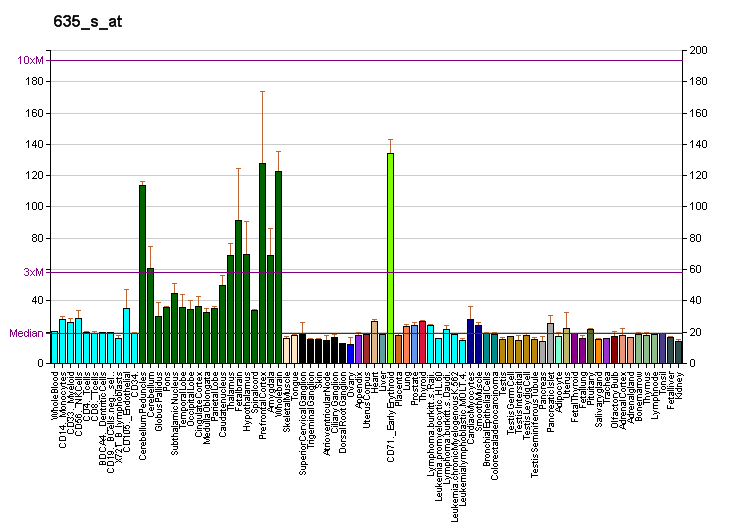

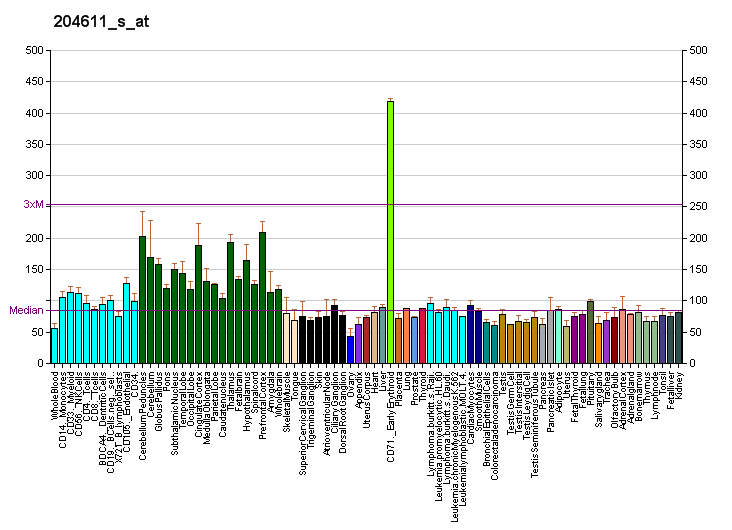
RNA expression pattern
Bgee	Human / Mouse (ortholog); Top expressed in: right hemisphere of cerebellum; paraflocculus of cerebellum; pons; right frontal lobe; prefrontal cortex; cerebellar vermis; dorsal motor nucleus of vagus nerve; nucleus accumbens; lateral nuclear group of thalamus; cingulate gyrus / Top expressed in: adrenal gland; cerebellum; cerebellar cortex; olfactory bulb; striatum of neuraxis; superior frontal gyrus; hypothalamus; primary visual cortex; bone marrow; hippocampus proper; More reference expression data
BioGPS	More reference expression data
Gene ontology
Molecular function	protein binding; protein phosphatase regulator activity; protein phosphatase activator activity
Cellular component	cytosol; protein phosphatase type 2A complex; cytoplasm; nucleus
Biological process	regulation of protein autophosphorylation; positive regulation of DNA-binding transcription factor activity; IRE1-mediated unfolded protein response; negative regulation of G0 to G1 transition; positive regulation of neurotrophin TRK receptor signaling pathway; positive regulation of neuron projection development; positive regulation of protein-containing complex assembly; regulation of peptidyl-tyrosine phosphorylation; positive regulation of transcription by RNA polymerase II; signal transduction; regulation of signaling receptor activity; cellular response to growth factor stimulus; regulation of protein phosphorylation; regulation of phosphatidylinositol 3-kinase signaling; regulation of phosphoprotein phosphatase activity; protein dephosphorylation; negative regulation of protein kinase B signaling
Sources:Amigo / QuickGO
Orthologs
Databases	NCBI: entry; OMA: entry
Species	Human	Mouse
Entrez	5526	225849
Ensembl	ENSG00000068971	ENSMUSG00000024777
UniProt	Q15173	Q6PD28
RefSeq (mRNA)	NM_006244	NM_198168
RefSeq (protein)	NP_006235	NP_937811
Location (UCSC)	Chr 11: 64.92 – 64.93 Mb	Chr 19: 6.28 – 6.29 Mb
PubMed search
- Wikidata
View/Edit Human	View/Edit Mouse

Serine/threonine-protein phosphatase 2A 56 kDa regulatory subunit beta isoform is an enzyme that in humans is encoded by the PPP2R5B gene.

== Function ==
The product of this gene belongs to the phosphatase 2A regulatory subunit B family. Protein phosphatase 2A is one of the four major Ser/Thr phosphatases, and it is implicated in the negative control of cell growth and division. It consists of a common heteromeric core enzyme, which is composed of a catalytic subunit and a constant regulatory subunit, that associates with a variety of regulatory subunits. The B regulatory subunit might modulate substrate selectivity and catalytic activity. This gene encodes a beta isoform of the regulatory subunit B56 subfamily.

== Interactions ==
PPP2R5B has been shown to interact with PPP2R1B and PPP2CA.
