= PPP2R2A =

Enzyme found in humans

Identifiers
- Aliases: PPP2R2A, B55A, B55ALPHA, PR52A, PR55A, protein phosphatase 2 regulatory subunit Balpha, PR55alpha
- External IDs: OMIM: 604941; MGI: 1919228; GeneCards: PPP2R2A
Available structures
PDB	Ortholog search: PDBe RCSB
PDB	List of PDB id codes 3DW8

Gene location (Human)
Chr.	Chromosome 8 (human)
Band	8p21.2	Start	26,291,508 bp
Band	8p21.2	End	26,372,680 bp

Gene location (Mouse)
Chr.	Chromosome 14 (mouse)
Band	14|14 D1	Start	67,251,505 bp
Band	14|14 D1	End	67,309,893 bp
RNA expression pattern
Bgee	Human / Mouse (ortholog); Top expressed in: Achilles tendon; mucosa of esophagus; oral cavity; mucosa of pharynx; epithelium of colon; ventricular zone; glutes; secondary oocyte; skin of leg; skin of abdomen / Top expressed in: tail of embryo; somite; olfactory tubercle; cumulus cell; esophagus; atrioventricular valve; ventricular zone; globus pallidus; endocardial cushion; superior frontal gyrus; More reference expression data
BioGPS	n/a
Gene ontology
Molecular function	protein binding; protein serine/threonine phosphatase activity; protein phosphatase regulator activity; protein-containing complex binding; tau protein binding; protein phosphatase 2A binding
Cellular component	nucleoplasm; protein phosphatase type 2A complex; cytosol; synapse; glutamatergic synapse
Biological process	response to morphine; G2/M transition of mitotic cell cycle; nuclear-transcribed mRNA catabolic process, nonsense-mediated decay; protein dephosphorylation; mitotic cell cycle; peptidyl-serine dephosphorylation; developmental process; regulation of phosphoprotein phosphatase activity; mitotic nuclear membrane reassembly
Sources:Amigo / QuickGO
Orthologs
Databases	NCBI: entry; OMA: entry
Species	Human	Mouse
Entrez	5520	71978
Ensembl	ENSG00000221914	ENSMUSG00000022052
UniProt	P63151	Q6P1F6
RefSeq (mRNA)	NM_001177591; NM_002717	NM_001205188; NM_028032; NM_001360033; NM_001360034
RefSeq (protein)	NP_001171062; NP_002708	NP_001192117; NP_082308; NP_001346962; NP_001346963
Location (UCSC)	Chr 8: 26.29 – 26.37 Mb	Chr 14: 67.25 – 67.31 Mb
PubMed search
- Wikidata
View/Edit Human	View/Edit Mouse

Serine/threonine-protein phosphatase 2A 55 kDa regulatory subunit B alpha isoform is an enzyme regulator that in humans is encoded by the PPP2R2A gene.

== Function ==
The product of this gene belongs to the phosphatase 2 regulatory subunit B family. Protein phosphatase 2 is one of the four major Ser/Thr phosphatases, and it is implicated in the negative control of cell growth and division. It consists of a common heteromeric core enzyme, which is composed of a catalytic subunit and a constant regulatory subunit, that associates with a variety of regulatory subunits. The B regulatory subunit might modulate substrate selectivity and catalytic activity. This gene encodes an alpha isoform of the regulatory subunit B55 subfamily.

== Interactions ==
PPP2R2A has been shown to interact with:

- P70-S6 Kinase 1,
- PPP2CA,
- PPP2R1A,
- PPP2R1B,
- TGF beta receptor 1, and
- p107.
