= PPP2R3B =

Protein-coding gene in humans

Identifiers
- Aliases: PPP2R3B, NYREN8, PPP2R3L, PPP2R3LY, PR48, protein phosphatase 2 regulatory subunit B''beta, PR70
- External IDs: OMIM: 300339; MGI: 1335093; GeneCards: PPP2R3B
Available structures
PDB	Ortholog search: PDBe RCSB
PDB	List of PDB id codes 4I5L, 4I5N, 4MEW

Gene location (Human)
Chr.	X chromosome (human)
Band	X;Y	Start	333,933 bp
Band	X;Y	End	386,955 bp
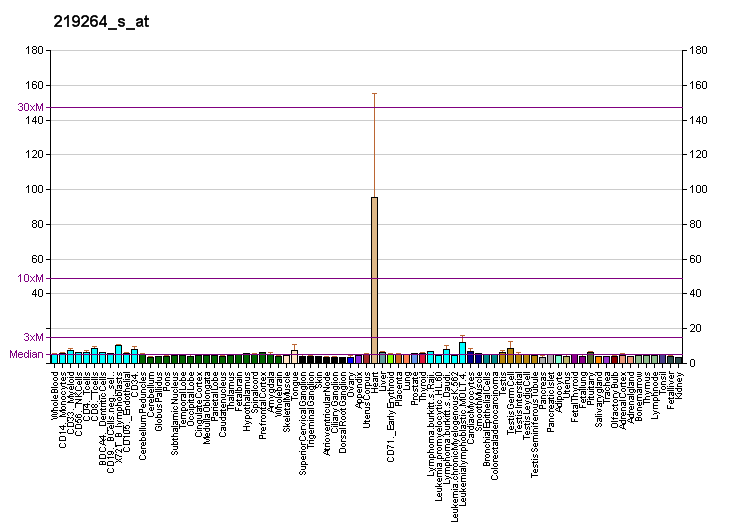
RNA expression pattern
Bgee	Human / Mouse (ortholog); Top expressed in: apex of heart; muscle of thigh; left ventricle; right auricle of heart; gastrocnemius muscle; sural nerve; skeletal muscle tissue; right uterine tube; right testis; left testis / n/a; More reference expression data
BioGPS	More reference expression data
Gene ontology
Molecular function	calcium ion binding; protein serine/threonine phosphatase activity; phosphoprotein phosphatase activity; protein binding; metal ion binding; protein phosphatase regulator activity
Cellular component	protein phosphatase type 2A complex; nucleus; nucleoplasm
Biological process	protein dephosphorylation; regulation of phosphoprotein phosphatase activity
Sources:Amigo / QuickGO
Orthologs
Databases	NCBI: entry; OMA: entry
Species	Human	Mouse
Entrez	28227	19054
Ensembl	ENSG00000276438; ENSG00000273850; ENSG00000167393	ENSMUSG00000093803
UniProt	Q9Y5P8	Q9Z176
RefSeq (mRNA)	NM_013239; NM_199326	NM_001039134; NM_001163415; NM_011154
RefSeq (protein)	NP_037371	n/a
Location (UCSC)	Chr X: 0.33 – 0.39 Mb	n/a
PubMed search
- Wikidata
View/Edit Human	View/Edit Mouse

Serine/threonine-protein phosphatase 2A regulatory subunit B'' subunit beta is an enzyme that in humans is encoded by the PPP2R3B gene.

== Function ==
Protein phosphatase 2 (formerly named type 2A) is one of the four major Ser/Thr phosphatases and is implicated in the negative control of cell growth and division. Protein phosphatase 2 holoenzymes are heterotrimeric proteins composed of a structural subunit A, a catalytic subunit C, and a regulatory subunit B. The regulatory subunit is encoded by a diverse set of genes that have been grouped into the B/PR55, B'/PR61, and B''/PR72 families. These different regulatory subunits confer distinct enzymatic specificities and intracellular localizations to the holozenzyme. The product of this gene belongs to the B'' family. The B'' family has been further divided into subfamilies. The product of this gene belongs to the beta subfamily of regulatory subunit B''. Alternative splicing results in multiple transcript variants encoding different isoforms.

== Interactions ==
PPP2R3B has been shown to interact with PPP2R1B, PPP2R1A, CDC6 and PPP2CA.
