= STRN4 =

Protein-coding gene in the species Homo sapiens

Identifiers
- Aliases: STRN4, ZIN, zinedin, PPP2R6C, striatin 4
- External IDs: OMIM: 614767; MGI: 2142346; GeneCards: STRN4

Gene location (Human)
| Chr. | Chromosome 19 (human) |
| Band | 19q13.32 | Start | 46,719,511 bp |
| Band | 19q13.32 | End | 46,746,994 bp |

Gene location (Mouse)
| Chr. | Chromosome 7 (mouse) |
| Band | 7|7 A2 | Start | 16,549,814 bp |
| Band | 7|7 A2 | End | 16,574,856 bp |
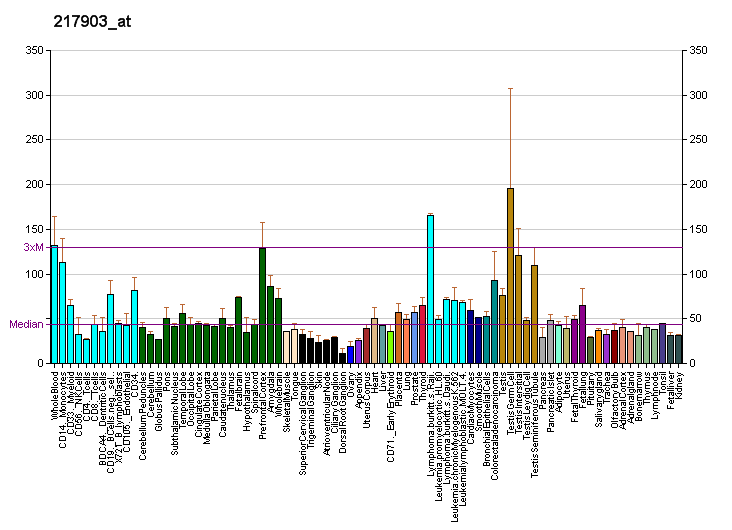
RNA expression pattern
| Bgee | Human / Mouse (ortholog); Top expressed in: left testis; right testis; sural nerve; ganglionic eminence; stromal cell of endometrium; ventricular zone; body of uterus; granulocyte; muscle layer of sigmoid colon; apex of heart / Top expressed in: spermatocyte; dentate gyrus of hippocampal formation granule cell; spermatid; superior frontal gyrus; primary visual cortex; neural layer of retina; ventricular zone; internal carotid artery; hippocampus proper; external carotid artery; More reference expression data |
| BioGPS | More reference expression data |
Gene ontology
| Molecular function | protein phosphatase 2A binding; protein binding; calmodulin binding; armadillo repeat domain binding; protein domain specific binding; protein-containing complex binding |
| Cellular component | cytoplasm; dendritic spine; protein phosphatase type 2A complex; cell projection; membrane; protein-containing complex; dendrite; FAR/SIN/STRIPAK complex |
| Biological process | biological process |
Sources:Amigo / QuickGO
Orthologs
| Databases | NCBI: entry; OMA: entry |
| Species | Human | Mouse |
| Entrez | 29888 | 97387 |
| Ensembl | ENSG00000090372 | ENSMUSG00000030374 |
| UniProt | Q9NRL3 | P58404 |
| RefSeq (mRNA) | NM_001039877; NM_013403 | NM_001039878; NM_133789 |
| RefSeq (protein) | NP_001034966; NP_037535 | NP_001034967; NP_598550 |
| Location (UCSC) | Chr 19: 46.72 – 46.75 Mb | Chr 7: 16.55 – 16.57 Mb |
| PubMed search |
- Wikidata
| View/Edit Human | View/Edit Mouse |

Striatin-4 is a protein that in humans is encoded by the STRN4 gene.

== Interactions ==
STRN4 has been shown to interact with STK24.
