= PPP2R1B =

Protein-coding gene in the species Homo sapiens

Identifiers
- Aliases: PPP2R1B, PP2A-Abeta, PR65B, protein phosphatase 2 scaffold subunit Abeta
- External IDs: OMIM: 603113; MGI: 1920949; GeneCards: PPP2R1B

Gene location (Human)
Chr.	Chromosome 11 (human)
Band	11q23.1	Start	111,726,908 bp
Band	11q23.1	End	111,766,389 bp

Gene location (Mouse)
Chr.	Chromosome 9 (mouse)
Band	9|9 A5.3	Start	50,756,601 bp
Band	9|9 A5.3	End	50,805,529 bp
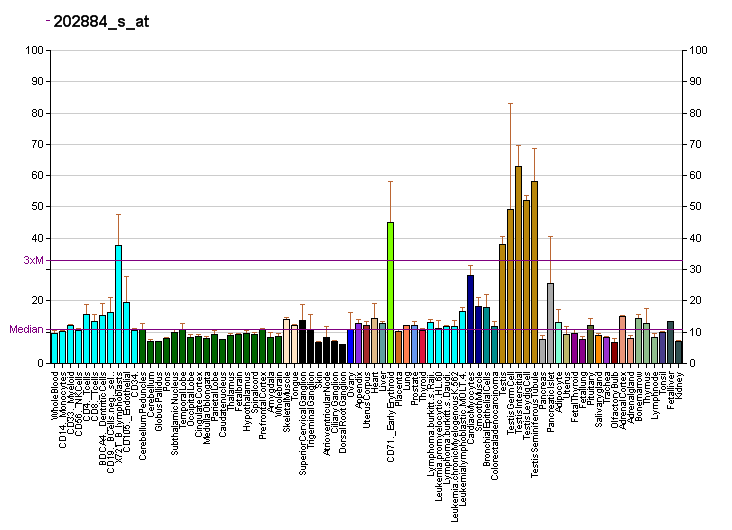

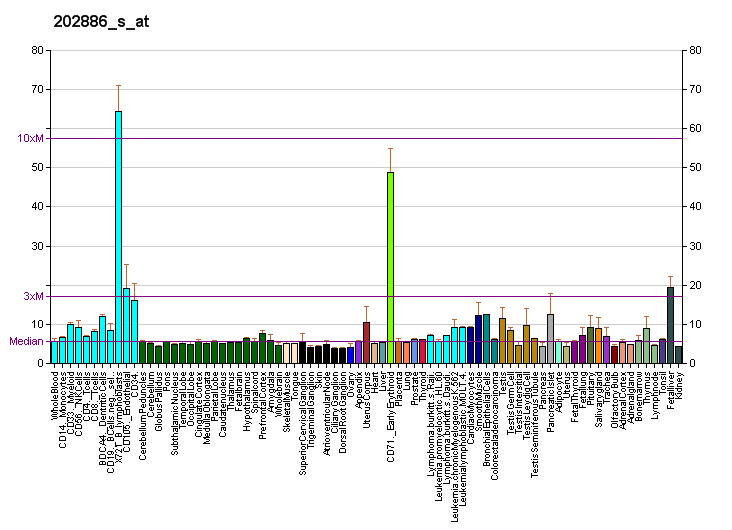

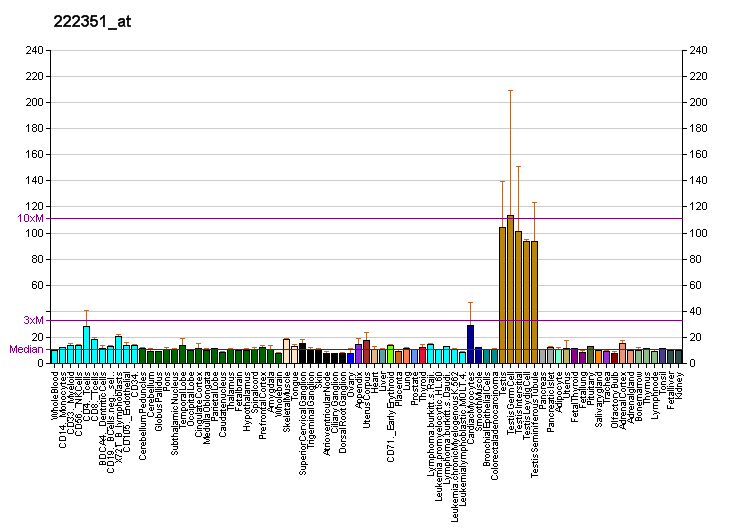
RNA expression pattern
Bgee	Human / Mouse (ortholog); Top expressed in: sperm; right lobe of liver; left testis; right testis; adipose tissue; body of pancreas; islet of Langerhans; secondary oocyte; abdominal fat; subcutaneous adipose tissue / Top expressed in: primitive streak; hair follicle; fetal liver hematopoietic progenitor cell; ureter; seminal vesicula; white adipose tissue; spermatid; condyle; epithelium of stomach; endothelial cell of lymphatic vessel; More reference expression data
BioGPS	More reference expression data
Gene ontology
Molecular function	protein binding; protein serine/threonine phosphatase activity; protein phosphatase regulator activity
Cellular component	membrane raft; extracellular exosome; protein phosphatase type 2A complex; cytoplasm
Biological process	apoptotic process involved in morphogenesis; positive regulation of extrinsic apoptotic signaling pathway in absence of ligand; protein dephosphorylation; regulation of phosphoprotein phosphatase activity
Sources:Amigo / QuickGO
Orthologs
Databases	NCBI: entry; OMA: entry
Species	Human	Mouse
Entrez	5519	73699
Ensembl	ENSG00000137713	ENSMUSG00000032058
UniProt	P30154	Q7TNP2
RefSeq (mRNA)	NM_001177562; NM_001177563; NM_002716; NM_181699; NM_181700	NM_001034085; NM_001286553; NM_028614
RefSeq (protein)	NP_001171033; NP_001171034; NP_002707; NP_859050; NP_859051	NP_001029257; NP_001273482; NP_082890
Location (UCSC)	Chr 11: 111.73 – 111.77 Mb	Chr 9: 50.76 – 50.81 Mb
PubMed search
- Wikidata
View/Edit Human	View/Edit Mouse

Serine/threonine-protein phosphatase 2A 65 kDa regulatory subunit A beta isoform is an enzyme that in humans is encoded by the PPP2R1B gene.

== Function ==
This gene encodes a constant regulatory subunit of protein phosphatase 2. Protein phosphatase 2 is one of the four major Ser/Thr phosphatases, and it is implicated in the negative control of cell growth and division. It consists of a common heteromeric core enzyme, which is composed of a catalytic subunit and a constant regulatory subunit, that associates with a variety of regulatory subunits. The constant regulatory subunit A serves as a scaffolding molecule to coordinate the assembly of the catalytic subunit and a variable regulatory B subunit. This gene encodes a beta isoform of the constant regulatory subunit A. Defects in this gene could be the cause of some lung and colon cancers. At least two transcript variants encoding different isoforms have been found for this gene.

== Discovery ==
The PPP2R1B gene was discovered as part of the Human Genome Project research center focused on chromosome 11.

== Clinical significance ==
Somatic alterations in PPP2R1B have been identified in colorectal and lung cancer tumors and cell lines, with evidence that these alterations affect protein function, supporting a role for PPP2R1B as a candidate tumor suppressor gene in these cancers. Experimental studies have shown that suppression of PPP2R1B expression enables immortalized human cells to become tumorigenic, and that the wild-type protein forms a complex with the small GTPase RalA. These findings support the role of PPP2R1B as a tumor suppressor involved in regulating RalA function.

A case series described nine cancer patients with germline loss-of-function (LOF) variants in PPP2R1B, with breast cancer being the most frequently observed diagnosis. In all documented cases, individuals also had a family history of cancers including breast, ovarian, prostate, uterine, renal, and colorectal cancer, suggesting that PPP2R1B may function as a predisposition gene in breast and potentially other cancers.

== Interactions ==
PPP2R1B has been shown to interact with:

- PPP2CA,
- PPP2CB,
- PPP2R2A,
- PPP2R3B,
- PPP2R5A,
- PPP2R5B,
- PPP2R5C,
- PPP2R5D, and
- PPP2R5E.
