= MOB-like protein phocein =

Protein found in humans

MOB4

Identifiers
- Aliases: MOB4, 2C4D, MOB1, MOB3, MOBKL3, PHOCN, PREI3, CGI-95, MOB family member 4, phocein
- External IDs: OMIM: 609361; MGI: 104899; GeneCards: MOB4

Gene location (Human)
Chr.	Chromosome 2 (human)
Band	2q33.1	Start	197,515,571 bp
Band	2q33.1	End	197,553,699 bp

Gene location (Mouse)
Chr.	Chromosome 1 (mouse)
Band	1|1 C1.2	Start	55,170,390 bp
Band	1|1 C1.2	End	55,194,058 bp
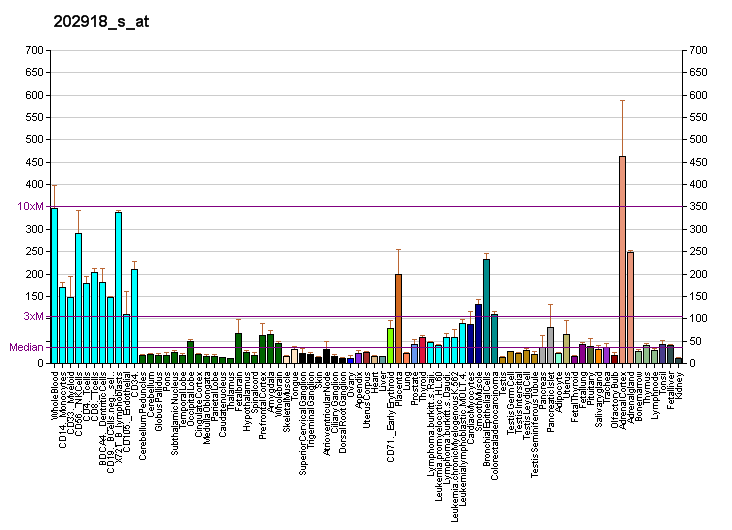

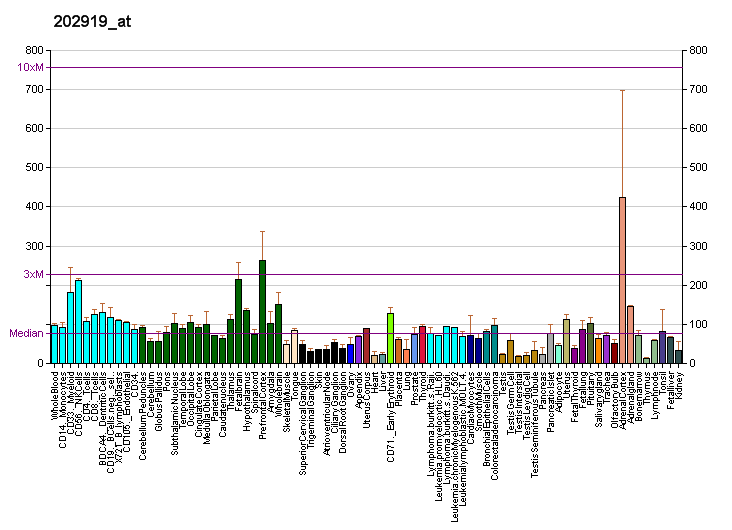
RNA expression pattern
Bgee	Human / Mouse (ortholog); Top expressed in: Skeletal muscle tissue of biceps brachii; right ventricle; thoracic diaphragm; deltoid muscle; Skeletal muscle tissue of rectus abdominis; vastus lateralis muscle; myocardium; triceps brachii muscle; tibialis anterior muscle; myocardium of left ventricle / Top expressed in: adrenal gland; interventricular septum; medial ganglionic eminence; parotid gland; left lung lobe; migratory enteric neural crest cell; vas deferens; vastus lateralis muscle; atrioventricular valve; abdominal wall; More reference expression data
BioGPS	More reference expression data
Gene ontology
Molecular function	protein binding; metal ion binding; kinase binding
Cellular component	cytoplasm; perinuclear region of cytoplasm; Golgi cisterna membrane; Golgi apparatus; membrane; cytosol; soma; dendritic spine
Biological process	transport
Sources:Amigo / QuickGO
Orthologs
Databases	NCBI: entry; OMA: entry
Species	Human	Mouse
Entrez	25843	19070
Ensembl	ENSG00000115540	ENSMUSG00000025979
UniProt	Q9Y3A3	Q6PEB6
RefSeq (mRNA)	NM_199482; NM_001100819; NM_001204094; NM_015387	NM_025283; NM_001310585
RefSeq (protein)	NP_001094289; NP_001191023; NP_056202; NP_955776	NP_001297514; NP_079559
Location (UCSC)	Chr 2: 197.52 – 197.55 Mb	Chr 1: 55.17 – 55.19 Mb
PubMed search
- Wikidata
View/Edit Human	View/Edit Mouse

MOB-like protein phocein is a protein that in humans is encoded by the MOB4 gene (previously MOBKL3). This protein is part of the STRIPAK complexes (striatin-interacting phosphatase and kinase) which are involved in phosphorylation and regulate various signaling pathways.

== Function ==
This gene was identified based on its similarity with the mouse counterpart. Studies of the mouse counterpart suggest that the expression of this gene may be regulated during oocyte maturation and preimplantation following zygotic gene activation. Alternatively spliced transcript variants encoding distinct isoforms have been observed.

== Interactions ==
MOBKL3 has been shown to interact with:

- CTTNBP2NL,
- CTTNBP2,
- FAM40A,
- PDCD10,
- PPP2CA,
- STK24,
- STK25,
- STK26,
- STRN3,
- STRN, and
- TRAF3IP3.
