= STRN3 =

Protein-coding gene in the species Homo sapiens

Identifiers
- Aliases: STRN3, SG2NA, PPP2R6B, striatin 3, S/G2NA
- External IDs: OMIM: 614766; MGI: 2151064; GeneCards: STRN3
Available structures
PDB	Ortholog search: PDBe RCSB
PDB	List of PDB id codes 4N6J

Gene location (Human)
Chr.	Chromosome 14 (human)
Band	14q12	Start	30,893,799 bp
Band	14q12	End	31,026,401 bp

Gene location (Mouse)
Chr.	Chromosome 12 (mouse)
Band	12|12 B3	Start	51,656,415 bp
Band	12|12 B3	End	51,738,680 bp
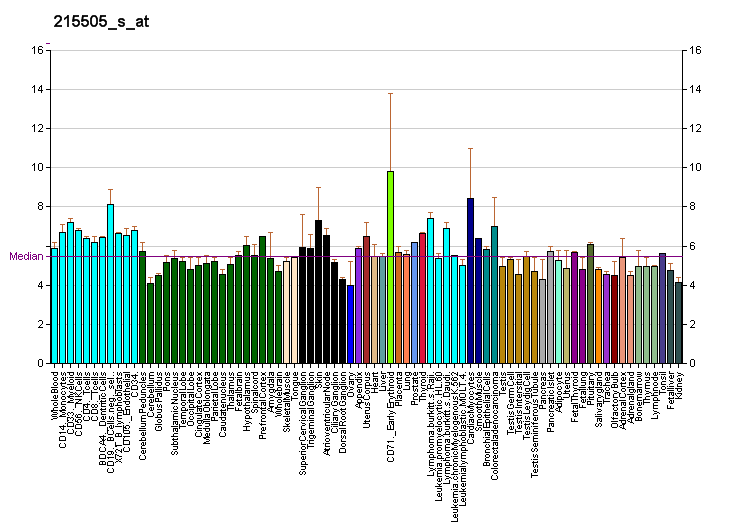

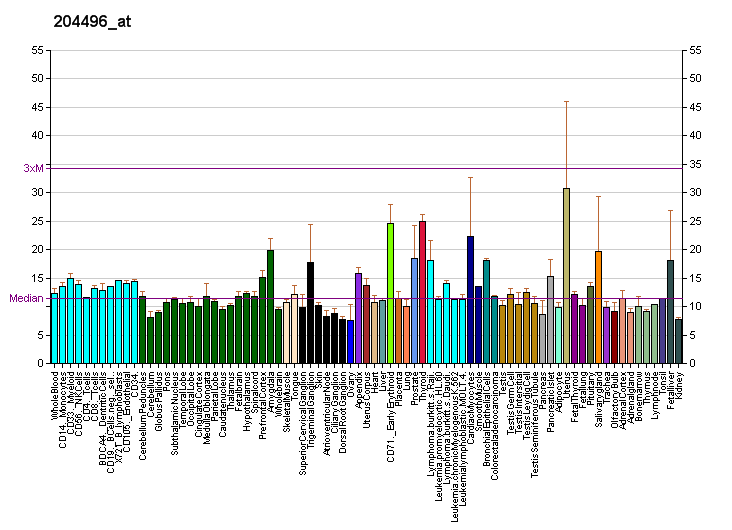
RNA expression pattern
Bgee	Human / Mouse (ortholog); Top expressed in: Achilles tendon; epithelium of colon; biceps brachii; sural nerve; Skeletal muscle tissue of biceps brachii; testicle; tail of epididymis; Skeletal muscle tissue of rectus abdominis; gastrocnemius muscle; muscle of thigh / Top expressed in: interventricular septum; triceps brachii muscle; temporal muscle; ankle; muscle of thigh; medial head of gastrocnemius muscle; intercostal muscle; sternocleidomastoid muscle; digastric muscle; soleus muscle; More reference expression data
BioGPS	More reference expression data
Gene ontology
Molecular function	DNA-binding transcription factor activity; protein phosphatase 2A binding; protein binding; calmodulin binding; armadillo repeat domain binding; protein-containing complex binding
Cellular component	cytoplasm; soma; plasma membrane; Golgi apparatus; dendrite; protein phosphatase type 2A complex; membrane; nucleus; nucleoplasm; protein-containing complex; FAR/SIN/STRIPAK complex
Biological process	response to estradiol; negative regulation of intracellular estrogen receptor signaling pathway; negative regulation of transcription by RNA polymerase II; negative regulation of transcription, DNA-templated; positive regulation of transcription by RNA polymerase II
Sources:Amigo / QuickGO
Orthologs
Databases	NCBI: entry; OMA: entry
Species	Human	Mouse
Entrez	29966	94186
Ensembl	ENSG00000196792	ENSMUSG00000020954
UniProt	Q13033	Q9ERG2
RefSeq (mRNA)	NM_001083893; NM_014574	NM_001172098; NM_052973; NM_001364437
RefSeq (protein)	NP_001077362; NP_055389	NP_001165569; NP_443205; NP_001351366
Location (UCSC)	Chr 14: 30.89 – 31.03 Mb	Chr 12: 51.66 – 51.74 Mb
PubMed search
- Wikidata
View/Edit Human	View/Edit Mouse

Striatin-3 is a protein that in humans is encoded by the STRN3 gene.

== Interactions ==
STRN3 has been shown to interact with:

- CTTNBP2NL,
- CTTNBP2,
- FAM40A,
- MOBKL3,
- PDCD10,
- PPP2CA,
- PPP2R1A,
- STK24,
- STK26, and
- STRN.
