= CTTNBP2NL =

Protein-coding gene in humans

Identifiers
- Aliases: CTTNBP2NL, CTTNBP2 N-terminal like
- External IDs: OMIM: 615100; MGI: 1933137; GeneCards: CTTNBP2NL

Gene location (Human)
Chr.	Chromosome 1 (human)
Band	1p13.2	Start	112,396,214 bp
Band	1p13.2	End	112,463,456 bp

Gene location (Mouse)
Chr.	Chromosome 3 (mouse)
Band	3|3 F2.2	Start	104,909,231 bp
Band	3|3 F2.2	End	104,960,462 bp
RNA expression pattern
Bgee	Human / Mouse (ortholog); Top expressed in: secondary oocyte; skin of arm; amniotic fluid; pancreatic epithelial cell; sural nerve; skin of hip; skin of thigh; gums; gingival epithelium; visceral pleura / Top expressed in: endothelial cell of lymphatic vessel; trigeminal ganglion; sciatic nerve; secondary oocyte; zygote; left lung lobe; primary oocyte; stroma of bone marrow; primitive streak; fossa; More reference expression data
BioGPS	n/a
Gene ontology
Molecular function	protein phosphatase 2A binding; protein binding
Cellular component	cytoplasm; actin cytoskeleton; cytoskeleton
Biological process	protein dephosphorylation; negative regulation of transporter activity; negative regulation of transmembrane transport
Sources:Amigo / QuickGO
Orthologs
Databases	NCBI: entry; OMA: entry
Species	Human	Mouse
Entrez	55917	80281
Ensembl	ENSG00000143079	ENSMUSG00000062127
UniProt	Q9P2B4	Q99LJ0
RefSeq (mRNA)	NM_018704	NM_001163332; NM_001163333; NM_030249
RefSeq (protein)	NP_061174	NP_001156804; NP_001156805; NP_084525
Location (UCSC)	Chr 1: 112.4 – 112.46 Mb	Chr 3: 104.91 – 104.96 Mb
PubMed search
- Wikidata
View/Edit Human	View/Edit Mouse

CTTNBP2 N-terminal-like protein is a protein that in humans is encoded by the CTTNBP2NL gene. It is a substrate for phosphorylation.

== Interactions ==
CTTNBP2NL has been shown to interact with:

- FAM40A, and
- MOBKL3,
- PDCD10,
- PPP2CA,
- PPP2R1A,
- STK24,
- STK26,
- STRN3, and
- STRN.
