= CCNG2 =

Protein-coding gene in humans

Identifiers
- Aliases: CCNG2, cyclin G2
- External IDs: OMIM: 603203; MGI: 1095734; HomoloGene: 3208; GeneCards: CCNG2; OMA:CCNG2 - orthologs

Gene location (Human)
Chr.	Chromosome 4 (human)
Band	4q21.1	Start	77,157,207 bp
Band	4q21.1	End	77,433,388 bp

Gene location (Mouse)
Chr.	Chromosome 5 (mouse)
Band	5|5 E2	Start	93,415,116 bp
Band	5|5 E2	End	93,424,090 bp
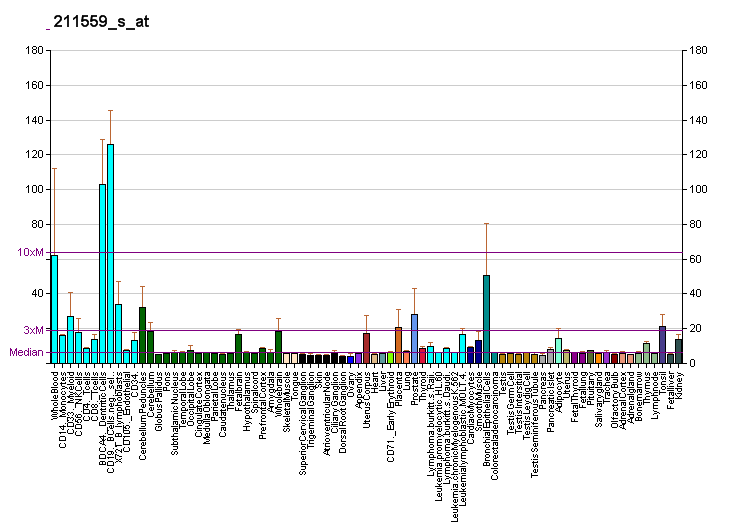

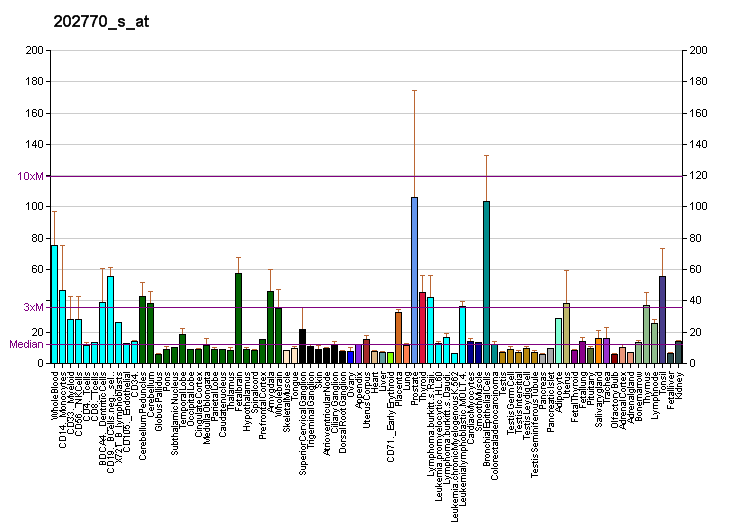

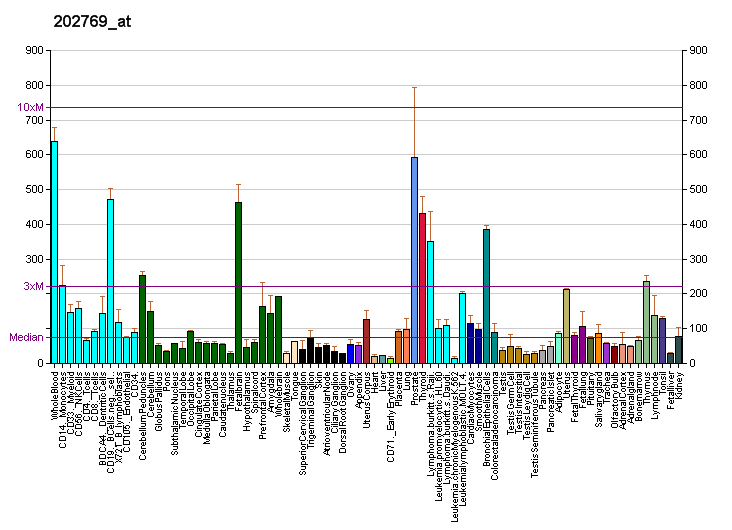
RNA expression pattern
Bgee	Human / Mouse (ortholog); Top expressed in: amniotic fluid; germinal epithelium; parietal pleura; tibia; visceral pleura; oral cavity; cerebellar vermis; epithelium of nasopharynx; Brodmann area 23; lactiferous duct / Top expressed in: medial ganglionic eminence; saccule; left colon; jejunum; thymus; decidua; superior cervical ganglion; otic vesicle; ileum; dorsal striatum; More reference expression data
BioGPS	More reference expression data
Gene ontology
Molecular function	protein kinase activity; cyclin-dependent protein serine/threonine kinase regulator activity; protein kinase binding
Cellular component	cytoplasm; cyclin-dependent protein kinase holoenzyme complex; nucleus
Biological process	cell cycle; regulation of cell cycle; cell division; regulation of cyclin-dependent protein serine/threonine kinase activity; mitotic cell cycle; protein phosphorylation; regulation of mitotic nuclear division; positive regulation of cell population proliferation; positive regulation of cell cycle; mitotic cell cycle phase transition
Sources:Amigo / QuickGO
Orthologs
Species	Human	Mouse
Entrez	901	12452
Ensembl	ENSG00000138764	ENSMUSG00000029385
UniProt	Q16589	O08918
RefSeq (mRNA)	NM_004354	NM_007635
RefSeq (protein)	NP_004345	NP_031661
Location (UCSC)	Chr 4: 77.16 – 77.43 Mb	Chr 5: 93.42 – 93.42 Mb
PubMed search
- Wikidata
View/Edit Human	View/Edit Mouse

Cyclin-G2 is a protein that in humans is encoded by the CCNG2 gene.

== Function ==
The eukaryotic cell cycle is governed by cyclin-dependent protein kinases (CDKs) whose activities are regulated by cyclins and CDK inhibitors. The 8 species of cyclins reported in mammals, cyclins A through H, share a conserved amino acid sequence of about 90 residues called the cyclin box. The amino acid sequence of cyclin G is well conserved among mammals. The nucleotide sequence of cyclin G1 and cyclin G2 are 53% identical. Unlike cyclin G1, cyclin G2 contains a C-terminal PEST protein destabilization motif, suggesting that cyclin G2 expression is tightly regulated through the cell cycle.

== Interactions ==
CCNG2 has been shown to interact with PPP2CA.
