= CTTNBP2 =

Protein-coding gene in the species Homo sapiens

Identifiers
- Aliases: CTTNBP2, C7orf8, CORTBP2, Orf4, cortactin binding protein 2
- External IDs: OMIM: 609772; MGI: 1353467; GeneCards: CTTNBP2

Gene location (Human)
Chr.	Chromosome 7 (human)
Band	7q31.31	Start	117,710,651 bp
Band	7q31.31	End	117,874,139 bp

Gene location (Mouse)
Chr.	Chromosome 6 (mouse)
Band	6|6 A2	Start	18,366,477 bp
Band	6|6 A2	End	18,514,842 bp
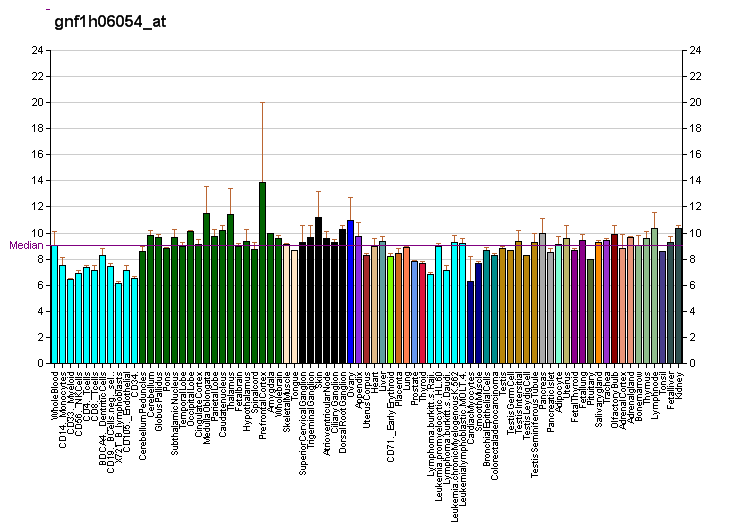
RNA expression pattern
Bgee	Human / Mouse (ortholog); Top expressed in: corpus callosum; ganglionic eminence; subthalamic nucleus; inferior ganglion of vagus nerve; pars reticulata; lateral nuclear group of thalamus; primary visual cortex; endothelial cell; external globus pallidus; C1 segment / Top expressed in: lateral septal nucleus; subiculum; lateral geniculate nucleus; piriform cortex; medial geniculate nucleus; superior cervical ganglion; medial dorsal nucleus; olfactory tubercle; visual cortex; anterior amygdaloid area; More reference expression data
BioGPS	More reference expression data
Gene ontology
Molecular function	SH3 domain binding
Cellular component	cytoplasm; dendritic spine; cell projection; cell cortex; synaptic vesicle; postsynaptic actin cytoskeleton; glutamatergic synapse
Biological process	brain development; regulation of synapse organization; regulation of modification of postsynaptic actin cytoskeleton
Sources:Amigo / QuickGO
Orthologs
Databases	NCBI: entry; OMA: entry
Species	Human	Mouse
Entrez	83992	30785
Ensembl	ENSG00000077063	ENSMUSG00000000416
UniProt	Q8WZ74	B9EJA2
RefSeq (mRNA)	NM_033427; NM_001363349; NM_001363350; NM_001363351	NM_080285
RefSeq (protein)	NP_219499; NP_001350278; NP_001350279; NP_001350280	NP_525024
Location (UCSC)	Chr 7: 117.71 – 117.87 Mb	Chr 6: 18.37 – 18.51 Mb
PubMed search
- Wikidata
View/Edit Human	View/Edit Mouse

Cortactin-binding protein 2 is a protein that in humans is encoded by the CTTNBP2 gene.

== Function ==
This gene encodes a protein with six ankyrin repeats and several proline-rich regions. A similar gene in rat interacts with a central regulator of the actin cytoskeleton.

== Interactions ==
CTTNBP2 has been shown to interact with:

- MOBKL3,
- PPP2CA,
- STK26,
- STRN3, and
- STRN.
