= SLMAP =

Protein-coding gene in the species Homo sapiens

Identifiers
- Aliases: SLMAP, SLAP, sarcolemma associated protein
- External IDs: OMIM: 602701; MGI: 1933549; GeneCards: SLMAP

Gene location (Human)
Chr.	Chromosome 3 (human)
Band	3p14.3	Start	57,755,450 bp
Band	3p14.3	End	57,930,003 bp

Gene location (Mouse)
Chr.	Chromosome 14 (mouse)
Band	14|14 A3	Start	26,413,168 bp
Band	14|14 A3	End	26,534,931 bp
RNA expression pattern
Bgee	Human / Mouse (ortholog); Top expressed in: saphenous vein; tail of epididymis; cardiac muscle tissue of right atrium; myocardium of left ventricle; smooth muscle tissue; seminal vesicula; vena cava; right ventricle; popliteal artery; tibial arteries / Top expressed in: tunica media of zone of aorta; cardiac muscle tissue of left ventricle; ascending aorta; olfactory tubercle; atrioventricular valve; aortic valve; left colon; atrium; iris; nucleus accumbens; More reference expression data
BioGPS	n/a
Gene ontology
Molecular function	protein binding
Cellular component	smooth endoplasmic reticulum; cytoplasm; integral component of membrane; sarcolemma; plasma membrane; integral component of plasma membrane; cytoskeleton; membrane; microtubule organizing center
Biological process	muscle contraction; protein localization to plasma membrane; regulation of membrane depolarization during cardiac muscle cell action potential; regulation of sodium ion transmembrane transport; regulation of voltage-gated sodium channel activity
Sources:Amigo / QuickGO
Orthologs
Databases	NCBI: entry; OMA: entry
Species	Human	Mouse
Entrez	7871	83997
Ensembl	ENSG00000163681	ENSMUSG00000021870
UniProt	Q14BN4	Q3URD3
RefSeq (mRNA)	NM_001304420; NM_001304421; NM_001304422; NM_001304423; NM_001311178 NM_001311179; NM_007159; NM_001377538; NM_001377539; NM_001377540; NM_001377541; NM_001377542; NM_001377545; NM_001377549; NM_001377551; NM_001377552; NM_001377555; NM_001377557; NM_001377559; NM_001377562; NM_001377921; NM_001377922; NM_001377923; NM_001377924; NM_001377925; NM_001377926; NM_001377927; NM_001377928	NM_032008; NM_001310445; NM_001347494
RefSeq (protein)	NP_001291349; NP_001291350; NP_001291351; NP_001291352; NP_001298107 NP_001298108; NP_009090	NP_001297374; NP_001334423; NP_114397
Location (UCSC)	Chr 3: 57.76 – 57.93 Mb	Chr 14: 26.41 – 26.53 Mb
PubMed search
- Wikidata
View/Edit Human	View/Edit Mouse

Sarcolemmal membrane-associated protein is a protein that in humans is encoded by the SLMAP gene.

== Interactions ==
SLMAP has been shown to interact with STK24.
