= PPP2R5A =

Enzyme found in humans

Identifiers
- Aliases: PPP2R5A, B56A, PR61A, protein phosphatase 2 regulatory subunit B'alpha, B56alpha
- External IDs: OMIM: 601643; MGI: 2388479; GeneCards: PPP2R5A

Gene location (Human)
Chr.	Chromosome 1 (human)
Band	1q32.3	Start	212,285,410 bp
Band	1q32.3	End	212,361,853 bp

Gene location (Mouse)
Chr.	Chromosome 1 (mouse)
Band	1|1 H6	Start	191,084,172 bp
Band	1|1 H6	End	191,135,469 bp
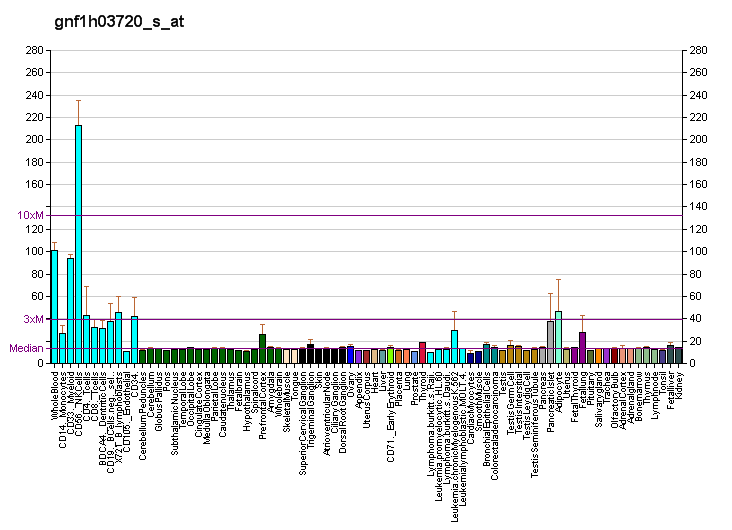

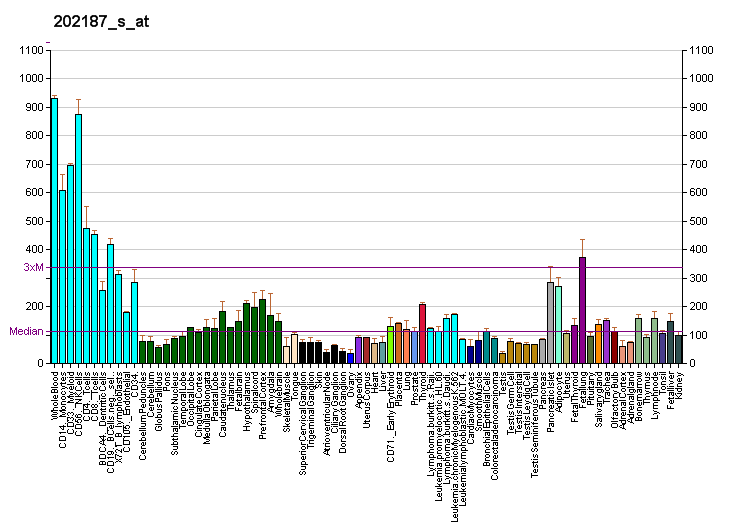
RNA expression pattern
Bgee	Human / Mouse (ortholog); Top expressed in: monocyte; rectum; bone marrow; subcutaneous adipose tissue; Skeletal muscle tissue of rectus abdominis; right lung; blood; right coronary artery; Skeletal muscle tissue of biceps brachii; cervix epithelium / Top expressed in: granulocyte; ankle joint; esophagus; muscle of thigh; genital tubercle; lip; right kidney; tail of embryo; neural layer of retina; superior frontal gyrus; More reference expression data
BioGPS	More reference expression data
Gene ontology
Molecular function	kinase binding; protein binding; protein phosphatase regulator activity; phosphoprotein phosphatase activity; protein phosphatase activator activity
Cellular component	cytoplasm; M band; protein phosphatase type 2A complex; Z discdkac; chromosome, centromeric region; membrane; nucleus; chromosome; cytosol; centrosome
Biological process	negative regulation of lipid kinase activity; positive regulation of protein dephosphorylation; signal transduction; negative regulation of protein localization to plasma membrane; protein dephosphorylation; regulation of phosphoprotein phosphatase activity; regulation of protein autophosphorylation
Sources:Amigo / QuickGO
Orthologs
Databases	NCBI: entry; OMA: entry
Species	Human	Mouse
Entrez	5525	226849
Ensembl	ENSG00000066027	ENSMUSG00000026626
UniProt	Q15172	Q6PD03
RefSeq (mRNA)	NM_006243; NM_001199756	NM_144880
RefSeq (protein)	NP_001186685; NP_006234	NP_659129
Location (UCSC)	Chr 1: 212.29 – 212.36 Mb	Chr 1: 191.08 – 191.14 Mb
PubMed search
- Wikidata
View/Edit Human	View/Edit Mouse

Serine/threonine-protein phosphatase 2A 56 kDa regulatory subunit alpha isoform is an enzyme that in humans is encoded by the PPP2R5A gene.

== Function ==
The product of this gene belongs to the phosphatase 2A regulatory subunit B family. Protein phosphatase 2A is one of the four major Ser/Thr phosphatases, and it is implicated in the negative control of cell growth and division. It consists of a common heteromeric core enzyme, which is composed of a catalytic subunit and a constant regulatory subunit, that associates with a variety of regulatory subunits. The B regulatory subunit might modulate substrate selectivity and catalytic activity. This gene encodes an alpha isoform of the regulatory subunit B56 subfamily.

== Interactions ==
PPP2R5A has been shown to interact with:

- AXIN1,
- CTLA-4,
- PPP2CA,
- PPP2R1A,
- PPP2R1B, and
- PPP2R5C
