= TRAF3IP3 =

Protein-coding gene in humans

Identifiers
- Aliases: TRAF3IP3, T3JAM, TRAF3 interacting protein 3
- External IDs: OMIM: 608255; MGI: 2441706; GeneCards: TRAF3IP3

Gene location (Human)
Chr.	Chromosome 1 (human)
Band	1q32.2	Start	209,756,032 bp
Band	1q32.2	End	209,782,320 bp

Gene location (Mouse)
Chr.	Chromosome 1 (mouse)
Band	1|1 H6	Start	192,857,761 bp
Band	1|1 H6	End	192,884,011 bp
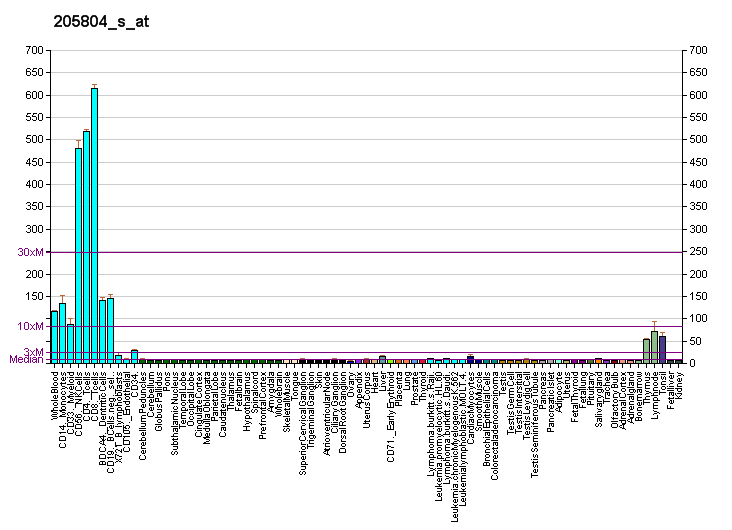

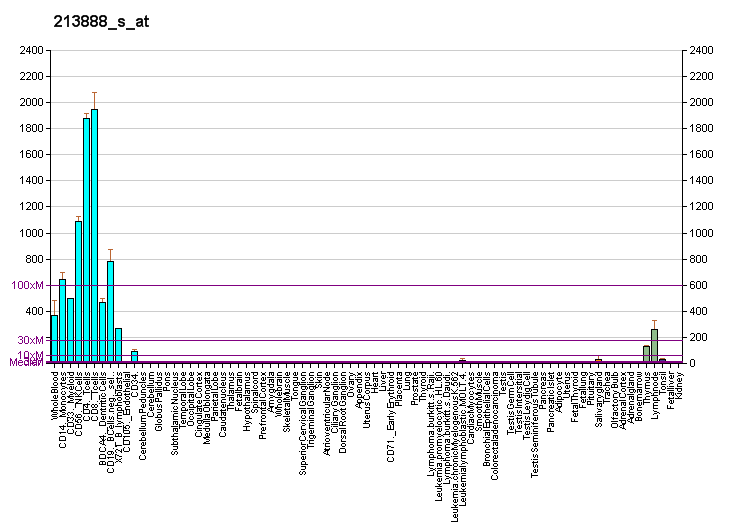
RNA expression pattern
Bgee	Human / Mouse (ortholog); Top expressed in: granulocyte; monocyte; blood; spleen; lymph node; appendix; bone marrow cell; thymus; epithelium of nasopharynx; trabecular bone / Top expressed in: granulocyte; thymus; mesenteric lymph nodes; neural layer of retina; blood; spleen; outer nuclear layer; tongue; inner nuclear layer; bone marrow; More reference expression data
BioGPS	More reference expression data
Orthologs
Databases	NCBI: entry; OMA: entry
Species	Human	Mouse
Entrez	80342	215243
Ensembl	ENSG00000009790	ENSMUSG00000037318
UniProt	Q9Y228	Q8C0G2
RefSeq (mRNA)	NM_001287754; NM_025228; NM_001320143; NM_001320144	NM_153137
RefSeq (protein)	NP_001274683; NP_001307072; NP_001307073; NP_079504	NP_694777
Location (UCSC)	Chr 1: 209.76 – 209.78 Mb	Chr 1: 192.86 – 192.88 Mb
PubMed search
- Wikidata
View/Edit Human	View/Edit Mouse

TRAF3-interacting JNK-activating modulator is a protein that in humans is encoded by the TRAF3IP3 gene.

== Interactions ==
TRAF3IP3 has been shown to interact with STRN, MOBKL3, STK24 and FAM40A.
