= KLF7 =

Protein-coding gene in the species Homo sapiens

Identifiers
- Aliases: KLF7, UKLF, Kruppel-like factor 7 (ubiquitous), Kruppel like factor 7
- External IDs: OMIM: 604865; MGI: 1935151; GeneCards: KLF7

Gene location (Human)
Chr.	Chromosome 2 (human)
Band	2q33.3	Start	207,074,137 bp
Band	2q33.3	End	207,167,267 bp

Gene location (Mouse)
Chr.	Chromosome 1 (mouse)
Band	1|1 C2	Start	64,068,606 bp
Band	1|1 C2	End	64,161,441 bp
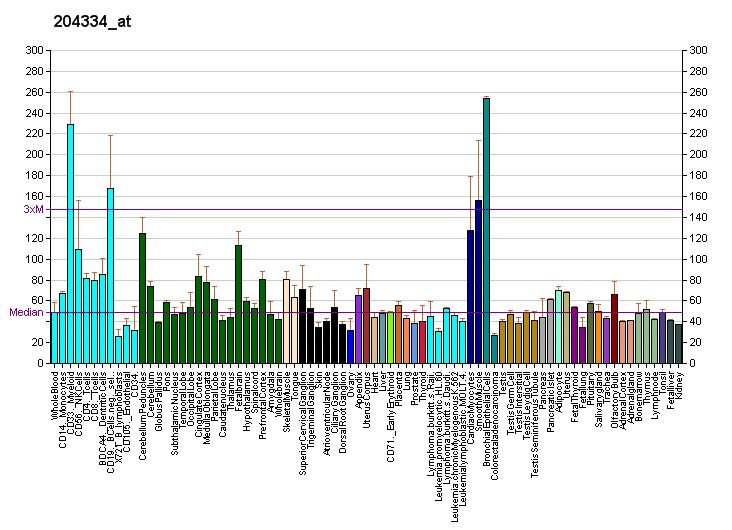
RNA expression pattern
Bgee	Human / Mouse (ortholog); Top expressed in: buccal mucosa cell; saphenous vein; ganglionic eminence; Achilles tendon; spinal ganglia; bone marrow cell; sural nerve; gonad; hair follicle; testicle / Top expressed in: Rostral migratory stream; trigeminal ganglion; spinal ganglia; supraoptic nucleus; lumbar spinal ganglion; aortic valve; ascending aorta; barrel cortex; saccule; motor neuron; More reference expression data
BioGPS	More reference expression data
Gene ontology
Molecular function	DNA-binding transcription factor activity; DNA binding; transcription coactivator activity; zinc ion binding; metal ion binding; nucleic acid binding; RNA polymerase II cis-regulatory region sequence-specific DNA binding; DNA-binding transcription activator activity, RNA polymerase II-specific; DNA-binding transcription factor activity, RNA polymerase II-specific
Cellular component	nucleus
Biological process	regulation of transcription by RNA polymerase II; positive regulation of transcription, DNA-templated; regulation of transcription, DNA-templated; axonogenesis; transcription, DNA-templated; dendrite morphogenesis; axon guidance; transcription by RNA polymerase II; positive regulation of transcription by RNA polymerase II; regulation of epidermal cell differentiation; regulation of insulin secretion; negative regulation of adipose tissue development; negative regulation of transcription by RNA polymerase II; glucose homeostasis; negative regulation of insulin secretion involved in cellular response to glucose stimulus
Sources:Amigo / QuickGO
Orthologs
Databases	NCBI: entry; OMA: entry
Species	Human	Mouse
Entrez	8609	93691
Ensembl	ENSG00000118263	ENSMUSG00000025959
UniProt	O75840	Q99JB0
RefSeq (mRNA)	NM_001270942; NM_001270943; NM_001270944; NM_003709	NM_033563
RefSeq (protein)	NP_001257871; NP_001257872; NP_001257873; NP_003700	NP_291041
Location (UCSC)	Chr 2: 207.07 – 207.17 Mb	Chr 1: 64.07 – 64.16 Mb
PubMed search
- Wikidata
View/Edit Human	View/Edit Mouse

Kruppel-like factor 7 (ubiquitous), also known as KLF7, is a protein which in humans is encoded by the KLF7 gene.

This protein is a member of the Kruppel-like family of transcription factors.
