= Serine/threonine-protein kinase 26 =

Protein-coding gene in humans

STK26

Identifiers
- Aliases: STK26, MASK, MST4, serine/threonine protein kinase 26, serine/threonine kinase 26
- External IDs: OMIM: 300547; MGI: 1917665; GeneCards: STK26
Available structures
PDB	Ortholog search: PDBe RCSB
PDB	List of PDB id codes 3GGF, 3W8I, 4FZA, 4FZD, 4FZF, 4GEH
Enzyme activity
EC #	BRENDA	ExPASy	KEGG	MetaCyc
2.7.11.1	↗	↗	↗	↗

Gene location (Human)
Chr.	X chromosome (human)
Band	Xq26.2	Start	132,023,302 bp
Band	Xq26.2	End	132,075,943 bp

Gene location (Mouse)
Chr.	X chromosome (mouse)
Band	X|X A5	Start	49,929,924 bp
Band	X|X A5	End	49,981,974 bp
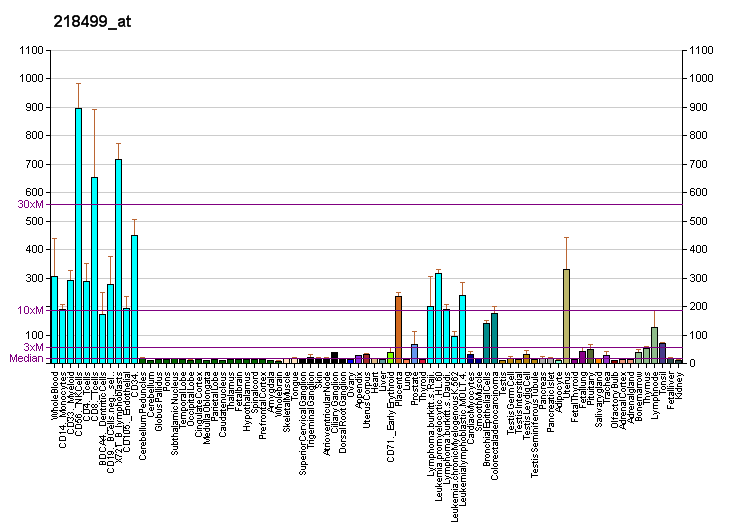
RNA expression pattern
Bgee	Human / Mouse (ortholog); Top expressed in: germinal epithelium; tibia; tail of epididymis; palpebral conjunctiva; seminal vesicula; cartilage tissue; epithelium of nasopharynx; bone marrow; trabecular bone; amniotic fluid / Top expressed in: mandibular prominence; abdominal wall; transitional epithelium of urinary bladder; efferent ductule; mesenteric lymph nodes; condyle; endocardial cushion; superior cervical ganglion; atrioventricular junction; parotid gland; More reference expression data
BioGPS	More reference expression data
Gene ontology
Molecular function	transferase activity; protein kinase activity; nucleotide binding; protein homodimerization activity; metal ion binding; kinase activity; protein binding; identical protein binding; ATP binding; magnesium ion binding; protein serine/threonine kinase activity; MAP kinase kinase kinase kinase activity
Cellular component	cytoplasm; cytosol; Golgi apparatus; Golgi membrane; Golgi-associated vesicle; apical plasma membrane; perinuclear region of cytoplasm; extracellular exosome; cell periphery; vesicle membrane; membrane
Biological process	regulation of apoptotic process; microvillus assembly; phosphorylation; regulation of hydrogen peroxide-induced cell death; protein phosphorylation; protein autophosphorylation; response to hydrogen peroxide; apoptotic process; execution phase of apoptosis; cellular response to starvation; negative regulation of cell migration; MAPK cascade; regulation of mitotic cell cycle; stress-activated protein kinase signaling cascade; neuron projection morphogenesis; signal transduction; activation of protein kinase activity
Sources:Amigo / QuickGO
Orthologs
Databases	NCBI: entry; OMA: entry
Species	Human	Mouse
Entrez	51765	70415
Ensembl	ENSG00000134602	ENSMUSG00000031112
UniProt	Q9P289	Q99JT2
RefSeq (mRNA)	NM_001042452; NM_001042453; NM_016542	NM_133729; NM_001313744
RefSeq (protein)	NP_001035917; NP_001035918; NP_057626	NP_001300673; NP_598490
Location (UCSC)	Chr X: 132.02 – 132.08 Mb	Chr X: 49.93 – 49.98 Mb
PubMed search
- Wikidata
View/Edit Human	View/Edit Mouse

Serine/threonine-protein kinase 26 is a protein that in humans is encoded by the STK26 gene (previously MST4). It has also been called as mammalian STE20-like protein kinase 4 (MST-4).

== Function ==
The product of this gene is a member of the GCK group III family of kinases, which are a subset of the Ste20-like kinases. The encoded protein contains an amino-terminal kinase domain, and a carboxy-terminal regulatory domain that mediates homodimerization. The protein kinase localizes to the Golgi apparatus and is specifically activated by binding to the Golgi matrix protein GM130. It is also cleaved by caspase-3 in vitro, and may function in the apoptotic pathway. Several alternatively spliced transcript variants of this gene have been described, but the full-length nature of some of these variants has not been determined.

== Interactions ==
RP6-213H19.1 has been shown to interact with:

- CTTNBP2NL,
- CTTNBP2,
- STRIP1,
- MOBKL3,
- PDCD10,
- STRN3, and
- STRN.
