= PPP2R1A =

Enzyme

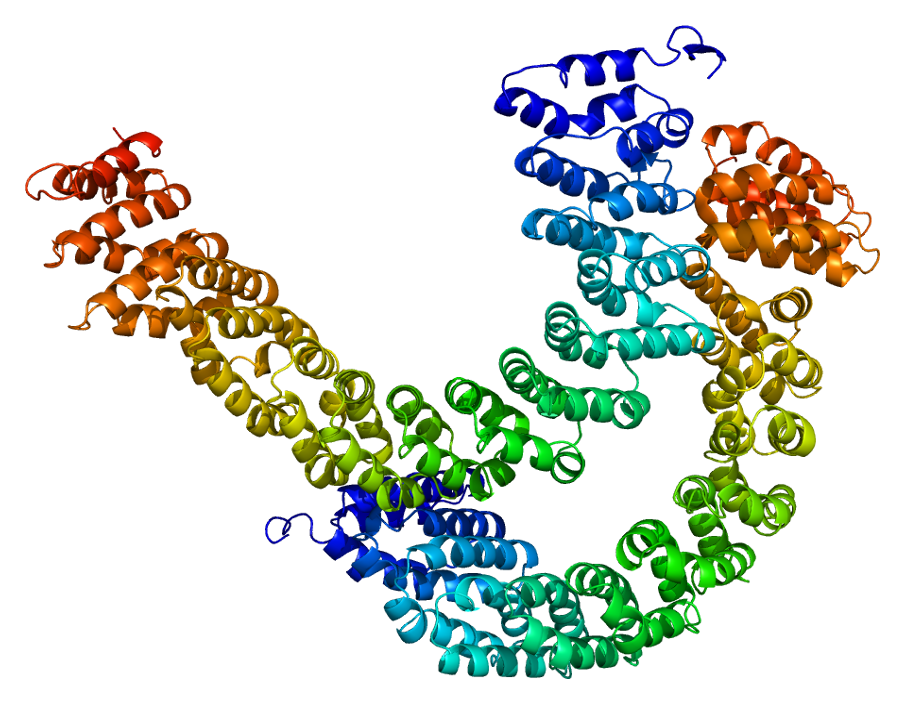

Identifiers
- Aliases: PPP2R1A, PP2A-Aalpha, PP2AAALPHA, PR65A, MRD36, protein phosphatase 2 scaffold subunit Aalpha, PP2AA
- External IDs: OMIM: 605983; MGI: 1926334; GeneCards: PPP2R1A
Available structures
PDB	Ortholog search: PDBe RCSB
PDB	List of PDB id codes 1B3U, 2IE3, 2IE4, 2NPP, 2NYL, 2NYM, 2PKG, 3C5W, 3DW8, 3K7V, 3K7W, 4I5L, 4I5N, 4LAC,%%s2IE4, 2NPP, 2IE3, 3K7V, 3K7W

Gene location (Human)
Chr.	Chromosome 19 (human)
Band	19q13.41	Start	52,190,048 bp
Band	19q13.41	End	52,229,518 bp

Gene location (Mouse)
Chr.	Chromosome 17 (mouse)
Band	17|17 A3.2	Start	21,165,573 bp
Band	17|17 A3.2	End	21,186,178 bp
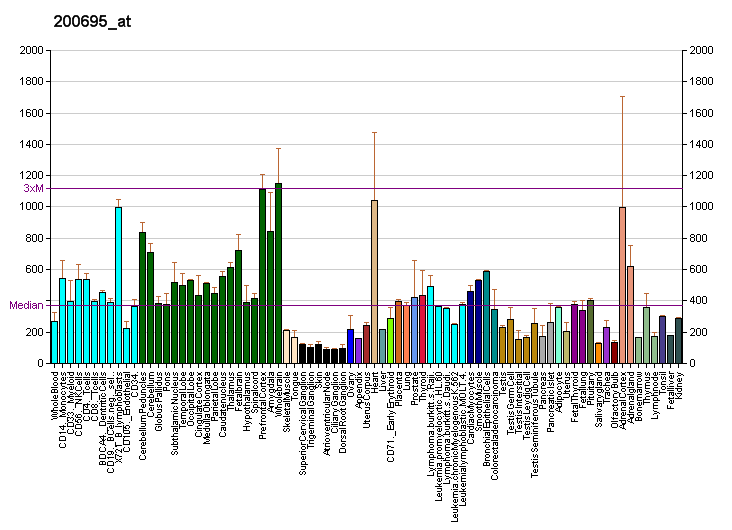
RNA expression pattern
Bgee	Human / Mouse (ortholog); Top expressed in: apex of heart; ganglionic eminence; right frontal lobe; right hemisphere of cerebellum; ventricular zone; right adrenal cortex; prefrontal cortex; cingulate gyrus; right auricle of heart; left adrenal cortex / Top expressed in: vestibular membrane of cochlear duct; motor neuron; facial motor nucleus; primitive streak; endothelial cell of lymphatic vessel; anterior horn of spinal cord; vas deferens; ciliary body; medial ganglionic eminence; hair follicle; More reference expression data
BioGPS	More reference expression data
Gene ontology
Molecular function	protein serine/threonine phosphatase activity; protein binding; protein heterodimerization activity; protein phosphatase regulator activity; protein antigen binding
Cellular component	cytoplasm; cytosol; microtubule cytoskeleton; protein phosphatase type 2A complex; chromosome; mitochondrion; chromosome, centromeric region; extracellular exosome; nucleus; plasma membrane; membrane; lateral plasma membrane; dendrite; cell projection; synapse; glutamatergic synapse
Biological process	apoptotic process; regulation of meiotic cell cycle process involved in oocyte maturation; meiotic sister chromatid cohesion, centromeric; regulation of transcription, DNA-templated; ceramide metabolic process; regulation of DNA replication; chromosome segregation; protein dephosphorylation; meiotic spindle elongation; female meiotic nuclear division; response to organic substance; positive regulation of extrinsic apoptotic signaling pathway in absence of ligand; peptidyl-serine dephosphorylation; regulation of Wnt signaling pathway; regulation of cell adhesion; G2/M transition of mitotic cell cycle; negative regulation of cell growth; RNA splicing; regulation of cell differentiation; regulation of growth; mitotic nuclear membrane reassembly; mitotic sister chromatid separation; nuclear-transcribed mRNA catabolic process, nonsense-mediated decay; second-messenger-mediated signaling; ciliary basal body-plasma membrane docking; negative regulation of tyrosine phosphorylation of STAT protein; regulation of G2/M transition of mitotic cell cycle; regulation of phosphoprotein phosphatase activity; protein-containing complex assembly
Sources:Amigo / QuickGO
Orthologs
Databases	NCBI: entry; OMA: entry
Species	Human	Mouse
Entrez	5518	51792
Ensembl	ENSG00000105568	ENSMUSG00000007564
UniProt	P30153	Q76MZ3
RefSeq (mRNA)	NM_014225; NM_001363656	NM_016891
RefSeq (protein)	NP_055040; NP_001350585; NP_055040.2	NP_058587
Location (UCSC)	Chr 19: 52.19 – 52.23 Mb	Chr 17: 21.17 – 21.19 Mb
PubMed search
- Wikidata
View/Edit Human	View/Edit Mouse

Serine/threonine-protein phosphatase 2A 65 kDa regulatory subunit A alpha isoform is an enzyme that in humans is encoded by the PPP2R1A gene. In the plant Arabidopsis thaliana a similar enzyme is encoded by the RCN1 gene (At1g25490).

== Function ==
This gene encodes a constant regulatory subunit of protein phosphatase 2. Protein phosphatase 2 is one of the four major Ser/Thr phosphatases, and it is implicated in the negative control of cell growth and division. It consists of a common heteromeric core enzyme, which is composed of a catalytic subunit and a constant regulatory subunit, that associates with a variety of regulatory subunits. The constant regulatory subunit A serves as a scaffolding molecule to coordinate the assembly of the catalytic subunit and a variable regulatory B subunit. This gene encodes an alpha isoform of the constant regulatory subunit A.

== Role in human pathology ==
Mutations of the PPP2R1A gene cause Houge-Janssens syndrome-2, an intellectual developmental disorder.

PPP2R1A encodes the scaffolding subunit of PP2A, a protein complex with tumor-suppressive functions that regulates cell growth and survival. Mutations in PPP2R1A can disrupt PP2A activity and contribute to the development and progression of certain cancers.

== Interactions ==
PPP2R1A has been shown to interact with:

- CTTNBP2NL,
- FAM40A,
- PPP2CB, PPP2CA, PPP4C,
- PPP2R2A,
- PPP2R3B,
- PPP2R5A.
- STK24,
- STRN, and
- STRN3.

PPP2R1A has also been shown to bind to sphingosine, a bioactive sphingolipid that activates PP2A. Given PP2A's tumor-suppressive functions, sphingosine-mediated PP2A activation may have potential anticancer implications.

== Arabidopsis RCN1 ==
RCN1 At1g25490 is one of three genes in Arabidopsis encoding Phosphoprotein Phosphatase 2A Regulatory Subunit A (PP2Aa). The association of different b subunits with a PP2Aa-PP2ac dimer is believed to determine substrate specificity.
