= STRN =

Protein-coding gene in the species Homo sapiens

Identifiers
- Aliases: STRN, SG2NA, PPP2R6A, striatin, STRN1
- External IDs: OMIM: 614765; MGI: 1333757; GeneCards: STRN

Gene location (Human)
Chr.	Chromosome 2 (human)
Band	2p22.2	Start	36,837,698 bp
Band	2p22.2	End	36,966,536 bp

Gene location (Mouse)
Chr.	Chromosome 17 (mouse)
Band	17|17 E3	Start	78,957,342 bp
Band	17|17 E3	End	79,044,625 bp
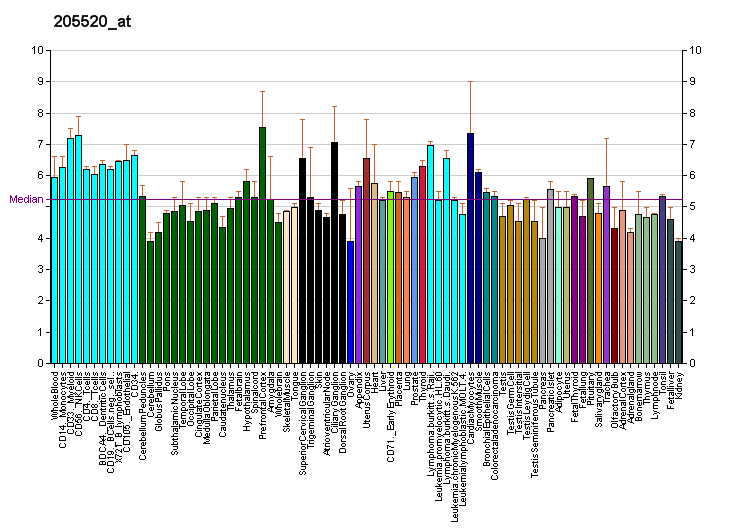
RNA expression pattern
Bgee	Human / Mouse (ortholog); Top expressed in: endothelial cell; amniotic fluid; corpus callosum; gingival epithelium; Achilles tendon; oral cavity; inferior ganglion of vagus nerve; germinal epithelium; subthalamic nucleus; epithelium of colon / Top expressed in: zygote; secondary oocyte; primary oocyte; dorsal striatum; olfactory tubercle; nucleus accumbens; cumulus cell; substantia nigra; superior frontal gyrus; globus pallidus; More reference expression data
BioGPS	More reference expression data
Gene ontology
Molecular function	protein phosphatase 2A binding; estrogen receptor binding; protein binding; calmodulin binding; armadillo repeat domain binding; protein-containing complex binding
Cellular component	cytoplasm; soma; postsynaptic membrane; dendritic spine; protein phosphatase type 2A complex; cell projection; membrane; postsynaptic density; bicellular tight junction; dendrite; FAR/SIN/STRIPAK complex
Biological process	dendrite development; Wnt signaling pathway; locomotory behavior; negative regulation of cell population proliferation; bicellular tight junction assembly
Sources:Amigo / QuickGO
Orthologs
Databases	NCBI: entry; OMA: entry
Species	Human	Mouse
Entrez	6801	268980
Ensembl	ENSG00000115808	ENSMUSG00000024077
UniProt	O43815	O55106
RefSeq (mRNA)	NM_003162	NM_011500
RefSeq (protein)	NP_003153	NP_035630
Location (UCSC)	Chr 2: 36.84 – 36.97 Mb	Chr 17: 78.96 – 79.04 Mb
PubMed search
- Wikidata
View/Edit Human	View/Edit Mouse

Striatin is a protein that in humans is encoded by the STRN gene.

== Interactions ==
STRN has been shown to interact with:

- CTTNBP2NL,
- CTTNBP2,
- FAM40A,
- MOBKL3,
- PDCD10,
- PPP2CA,
- PPP2R1A,
- STK24,
- STK25,
- STK26,
- STRN3, and
- TRAF3IP3.
