= STK24 =

Protein-coding gene in the species Homo sapiens

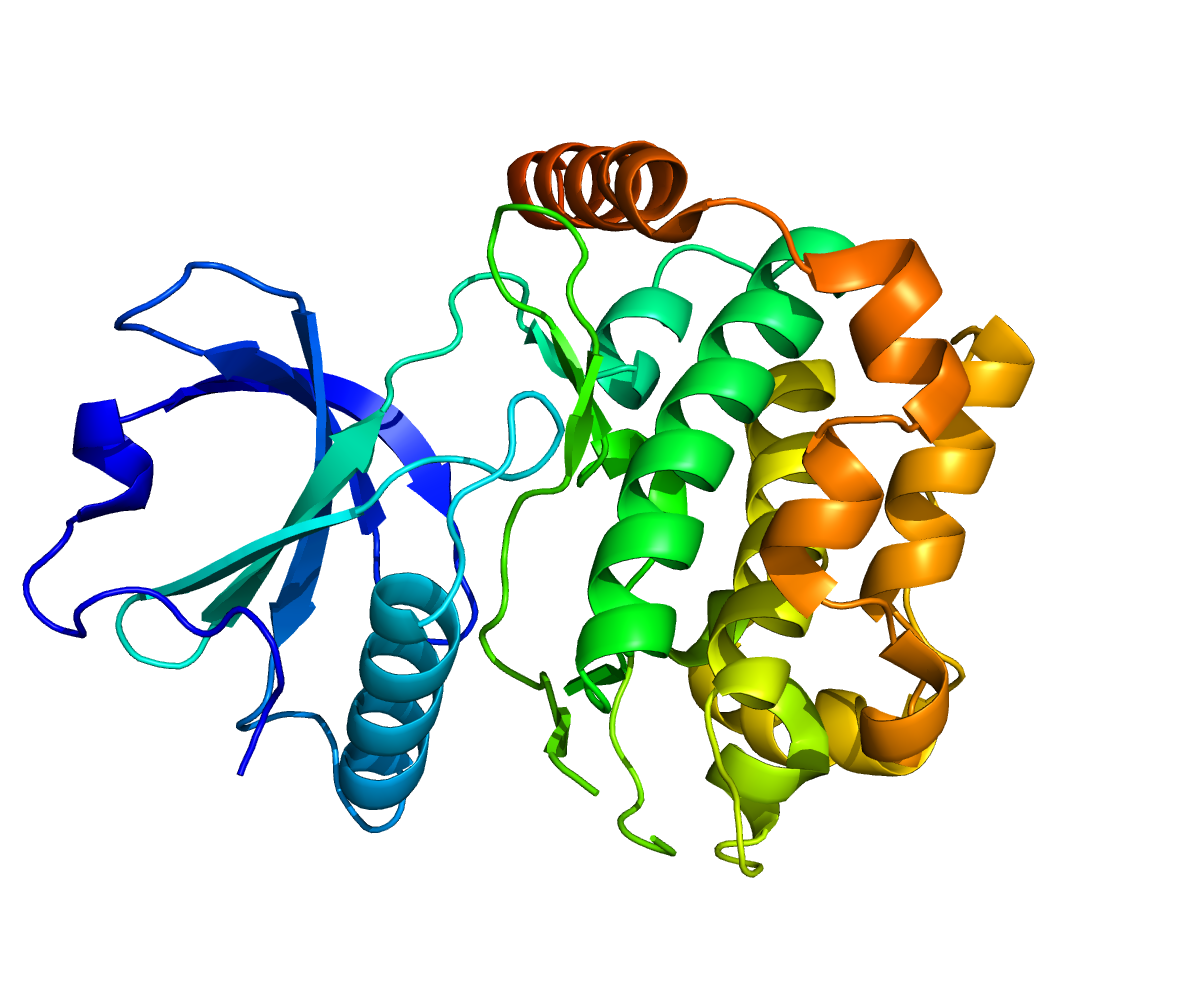

Identifiers
- Aliases: STK24, HEL-S-95, MST3, MST3B, STE20, STK3, serine/threonine kinase 24
- External IDs: OMIM: 604984; MGI: 2385007; GeneCards: STK24
Available structures
PDB	Ortholog search: PDBe RCSB
PDB	List of PDB id codes 3A7F, 3A7G, 3A7H, 3A7I, 3A7J, 3CKW, 3CKX, 3ZHP, 4O27, 4QML, 4QMM, 4QMN, 4QMO, 4QMP, 4QMQ, 4QMS, 4QMT, 4QMU, 4QMV, 4QMW, 4QMX, 4QMY, 4QMZ, 4QO9, 4U8Z, 4W8D, 4W8E, 4QNA
Enzyme activity
EC #	BRENDA	ExPASy	KEGG	MetaCyc
2.7.11.1	↗	↗	↗	↗

Gene location (Human)
Chr.	Chromosome 13 (human)
Band	13q32.2	Start	98,445,185 bp
Band	13q32.2	End	98,577,940 bp

Gene location (Mouse)
Chr.	Chromosome 14 (mouse)
Band	14 E5|14 64.95 cM	Start	121,523,755 bp
Band	14 E5|14 64.95 cM	End	121,617,423 bp
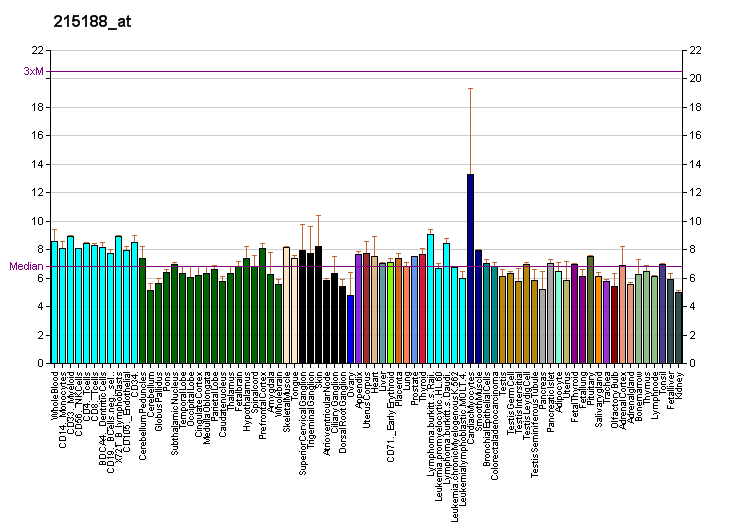

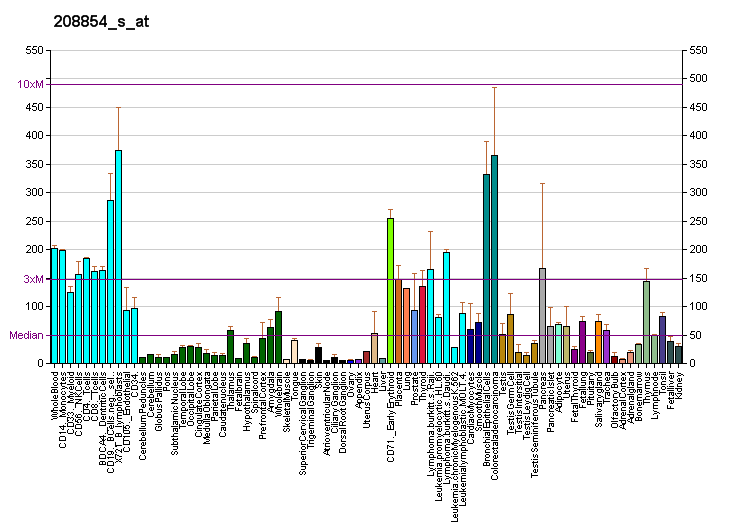

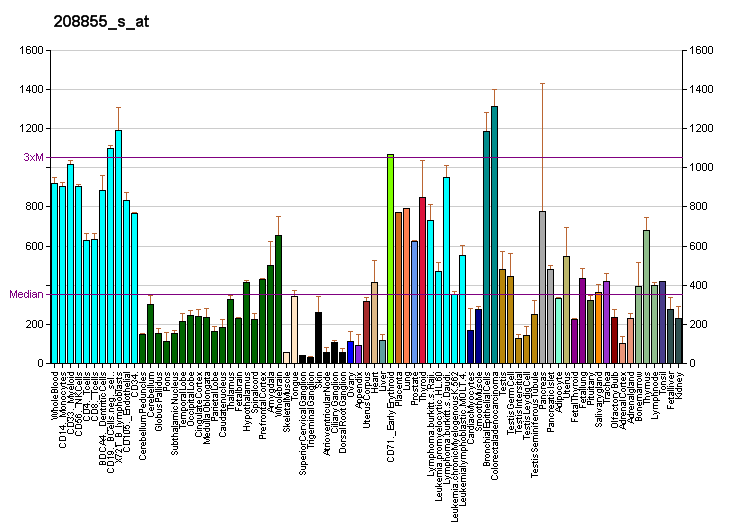
RNA expression pattern
Bgee	Human / Mouse (ortholog); Top expressed in: secondary oocyte; amniotic fluid; pancreatic ductal cell; retinal pigment epithelium; gingival epithelium; endothelial cell; hair follicle; palpebral conjunctiva; germinal epithelium; skin of thigh / Top expressed in: blood; ascending aorta; granulocyte; tail of embryo; aortic valve; transitional epithelium of urinary bladder; mesenteric lymph nodes; cumulus cell; genital tubercle; skin of external ear; More reference expression data
BioGPS	More reference expression data
Gene ontology
Molecular function	transferase activity; nucleotide binding; metal ion binding; kinase activity; protein binding; ATP binding; protein kinase activity; protein serine/threonine kinase activity; cadherin binding; MAP kinase kinase kinase kinase activity
Cellular component	membrane; nucleoplasm; nucleolus; extracellular exosome; nucleus; cytosol; cytoplasm; Golgi apparatus
Biological process	intrinsic apoptotic signaling pathway in response to oxidative stress; regulation of axon regeneration; phosphorylation; negative regulation of cell migration; response to hydrogen peroxide; signal transduction; apoptotic process; protein phosphorylation; execution phase of apoptosis; cellular response to starvation; protein autophosphorylation; MAPK cascade; regulation of mitotic cell cycle; stress-activated protein kinase signaling cascade; regulation of apoptotic process; neuron projection morphogenesis; activation of protein kinase activity
Sources:Amigo / QuickGO
Orthologs
Databases	NCBI: entry; OMA: entry
Species	Human	Mouse
Entrez	8428	223255
Ensembl	ENSG00000102572	ENSMUSG00000063410
UniProt	Q9Y6E0; Q5JV99	Q99KH8
RefSeq (mRNA)	NM_001032296; NM_001286649; NM_003576	NM_145465
RefSeq (protein)	NP_001027467; NP_001273578; NP_003567	NP_663440
Location (UCSC)	Chr 13: 98.45 – 98.58 Mb	Chr 14: 121.52 – 121.62 Mb
PubMed search
- Wikidata
View/Edit Human	View/Edit Mouse

Serine/threonine-protein kinase 24 is an enzyme that in humans is encoded by the STK24 gene located in the chromosome 13, band q32.2. It is also known as Mammalian STE20-like protein kinase 3 (MST-3). The protein is 443 amino acids long and its mass is 49 kDa.

== Classification and discovery ==
The yeast 'Sterile 20' gene (STE20) functions upstream of the mitogen-activated protein kinase (MAPK) cascade. In mammals, protein kinases related to STE20 can be divided into 2 subfamilies based on their structure and regulation. Members of the PAK subfamily (see PAK3) contain a C-terminal catalytic domain and an N-terminal regulatory domain that has a CDC42-binding domain. In contrast, members of the GCK subfamily (MAP4K2), also called the Sps1 subfamily, have an N-terminal catalytic domain and a C-terminal regulatory domain without a CDC42-binding domain. STK24 belongs to the GCK subfamily of STE20-like kinases.

The sterile 20 protein was first found in yeast. The MST-20 related kinases family is growing, having 28 members divided into two groups - p21-activated kinase and germinal center kinase (GCK) families. STK24 belongs to the germinal center kinase (GCK) III subfamily of sterile 20 kinases.

== Function ==
Kinases of GCKIII subfamily are involved in regulation of multiple functions of the cells and interaction with programmed cell death 10 (CCM3). CCM is a pathological vascular situation that, influencing the blood vessels in central nervous system (CNS), may cause stroke, seizure and even cerebral hemorrhage. It has been shown that STK24 and STK25 operate in the same cardiovascular development pathway with CCM3. According to the results of the experiment by Zhang et al., lack of STK24 has no effect on the amount of neutrophils or leucocytes, as well as it does not affect the chemotaxis of neutrophils. Zhang et al. also the interaction between STK24 and CCM. Using tandem affinity purification with mass spectrometry, they found that CCM3 is the main protein that binds to STK24 in HEK293 cells.

STK24 operates on serine and threonine residues and, as a response to oxidative stress and caspase activity, develops cell death.

STK24 is activated by autophosphorylation at Thr-190 and phosphorylation at this site is essential for its function. Phosphorylation by protein kinase A activates the isoform B of STK24.

The mutagenesis of four residues in STK24 have been carried out. In position 18, the replacement of threonine (T) with alanine (A) causes the reduction of phosphorylation by PKA. the modification in positions 65, where lysine (K) is replaced with A, and the position 190, where T is replaced with A, affects the activity and autophosphorylation. In residue 321, the change of aspartic acid (D) to Asparagine (N) reveals as loss of proteolytic cleavage by caspases. Those residues may play an important role apoptotic signal transduction.

== Structure and tissue distribution ==
STK24 has two subunits, 36kDa N-terminal subunit and 12 kDa C-terminal subunit. In the cells, STK24 is located in nucleus and less in cytoplasm and membrane. There are two isoforms of the protein, isoform A is ubiquitous and is expressed in 237 organs, isoform B is expressed in brain hippocampus and cerebral cortex.

== Interactions ==
STK24 has been shown to interact with PDCD10, TRAF3IP3, STRN3, MOBKL3, STRN, SLMAP, PPP2R1A, CTTNBP2NL, FAM40A and STRN4.
