= STRIP1 =

Protein-coding gene in humans

Identifiers
- Aliases: STRIP1, FAM40A, FAR11A, striatin interacting protein 1
- External IDs: OMIM: 617918; MGI: 2443884; GeneCards: STRIP1

Gene location (Human)
Chr.	Chromosome 1 (human)
Band	1p13.3	Start	110,031,577 bp
Band	1p13.3	End	110,074,641 bp

Gene location (Mouse)
Chr.	Chromosome 3 (mouse)
Band	3|3 F2.3	Start	107,519,848 bp
Band	3|3 F2.3	End	107,539,010 bp
RNA expression pattern
Bgee	Human / Mouse (ortholog); Top expressed in: mucosa of ileum; pancreatic ductal cell; right hemisphere of cerebellum; granulocyte; ganglionic eminence; body of uterus; bone marrow cell; right frontal lobe; ventricular zone; tibialis anterior muscle / Top expressed in: otic vesicle; hand; lens; ganglionic eminence; neural tube; ventricular zone; granulocyte; dentate gyrus of hippocampal formation granule cell; primary visual cortex; Rostral migratory stream; More reference expression data
BioGPS	n/a
Gene ontology
Molecular function	protein binding; molecular function; protein kinase binding
Cellular component	extracellular exosome; nucleus; cytoplasm; cytosol
Biological process	regulation of cell morphogenesis; cortical actin cytoskeleton organization
Sources:Amigo / QuickGO
Orthologs
Databases	NCBI: entry; OMA: entry
Species	Human	Mouse
Entrez	85369	229707
Ensembl	ENSG00000143093	ENSMUSG00000014601
UniProt	Q5VSL9	Q8C079
RefSeq (mRNA)	NM_001270768; NM_033088	NM_153563
RefSeq (protein)	NP_001257697; NP_149079	NP_705791
Location (UCSC)	Chr 1: 110.03 – 110.07 Mb	Chr 3: 107.52 – 107.54 Mb
PubMed search
- Wikidata
View/Edit Human	View/Edit Mouse

Striatin-interacting protein 1 is a protein that is located on chromosome 1 in humans and is encoded by the STRIP1 gene. STRIP1 is also known as FAM40A.

== Characteristics and secondary structure ==
FAM40A has an isoelectric point of 5.92 and a molecular weight of 95,575 daltons. It is predicted to have three transmembrane domains, making it a transmembrane protein. FAM40A does not contain a signal peptide and is also predicted to bind to DNA, possibly making it a membrane protein in the nuclear membrane.

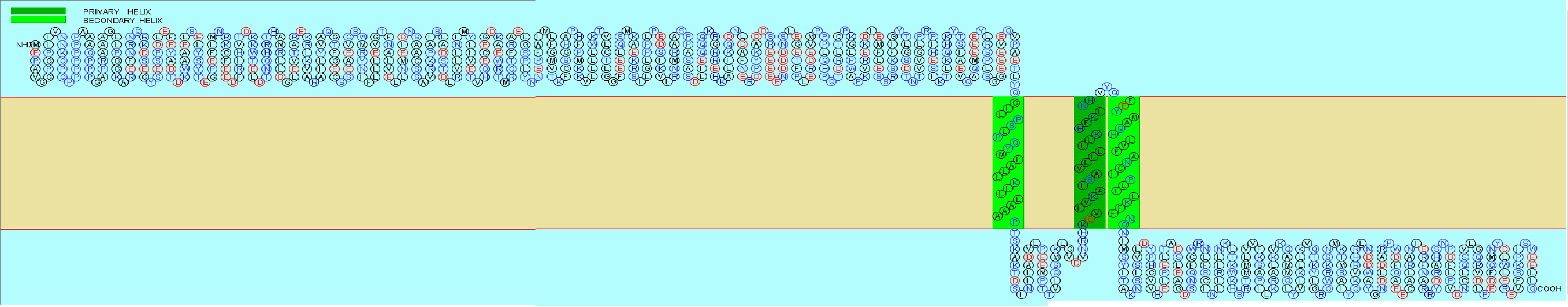
Prediction of the orientation of the transmembrane domains of FAM40A

The secondary structure of FAM40A is predicted to contain twenty-six alpha helices and two beta sheets. The 5' untranslated region of FAM40A is predicted to contain one stem-loop and the 3' untranslated region is predicted to contain eight stem-loop structures. Two miRNAs are predicted to bind to two of the stem-loop structures present in the 3' UTR region.

== Homology ==
FAM40A has no paralogs. However, it does have orthologs stretching all the way back to yeast. It has been suggested that FAM40A is a homolog to the yeast gene FAR11, which is involved in the recovery from cell cycle arrest.

The following table represents a small selection of orthologs found using searches in BLAST and BLAT. This is by no means a comprehensive list, however it does show the vast diversity of species where FAM40A orthologs are found.

Scientific name	Common name	Accession number (from NCBI)	Sequence length	Percent identity	Percent Similarity
Homo sapiens	Human	NP_149079	837	-	-
Pongo abelii	Sumatran orangutan	XP_002810520	837	99.6%	100%
Sus scrofa	Pig	XP_003125904	837	98.8%	100%
Equus caballus	Horse	XP_001493762	837	98.8%	100%
Mus musculus	Mouse	NP_705791	837	98%	100%
Rattus norvegicus	Rat	XP_001068288	837	97.8%	100%
Monodelphis domestica	Gray short-tailed opossum	XP_001372588	843	95.4%	100%
Danio rerio	Zebra fish	XP_001918929	813	83.4%	98%
Canis lupus familiaris	Dog	From BLAT	812	96.1%	100%
Ailuropoda melanoleuca	Panda	From BLAT	823	$96.2	100%
Oryzias latipes	Medaka	From BLAT	751	78.4%	96%
Xenopus (Silurana) tropicalis	Western clawed frog	NP_001027483	819	86.4%	96%
Aedes aegypti	Yellow-fever mosquito	XP_001658692	829	51.2%	97%
Tribolium castaneum	Red flour beetle	XP_001815164	817	57.4%	97%
Hydra magnipapillata	Hydra hydrozoan	XP_002164866	830	44%	97%
Ciona intestinalis	Sea squirt	XP_002130558	867	46.4%	97%
Pediculus humanus corporis	Human lice	XP_002425964	808	52.7%	97%
Nasonia vitripennis	Jewel wasp	XP_001603859	802	52.7%	97%
Drosophila erecta	Fruit fly	XP_001971743	882	45.2%	97%
Saccharomyces cerevisiae	Bakers yeast	NP_014272	953	18.9%	97%

== Expression ==
FAM40A is expressed in high levels during the blastocyst, eight-cell stage, and fetal stages of development. FAM40A has also been shown to be expressed in high levels in the mammary glands, brain, thymus, mouth and the testes. It has also been shown to be expressed in high levels in mammary gland tumors, leukemia cells, and germ cell tumors.

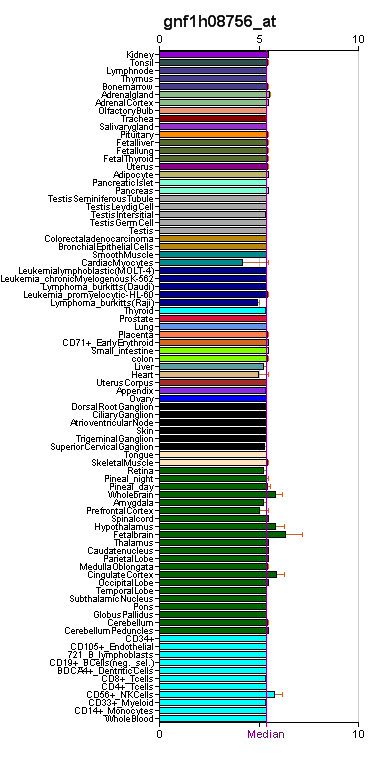
Predicted FAM40A expression in different tissues of the body

== Transcription regulation ==
FAM40A is predicted to have a promoter region 789 base pairs upstream of the start of transcription. The SOX transcription factors are predicted to bind to the promoter region of the FAM40A gene, possibly indicating a role in sex determination.

== Interactions ==
FAM40A has been shown to interact with STK26, STRN, PDCD10, TRAF3IP3, STRN3, PPP2R1A, MOBKL3, CTTNBP2NL, STK24 and PPP2CA.
