= PDCD10 =

Protein-coding gene in the species Homo sapiens

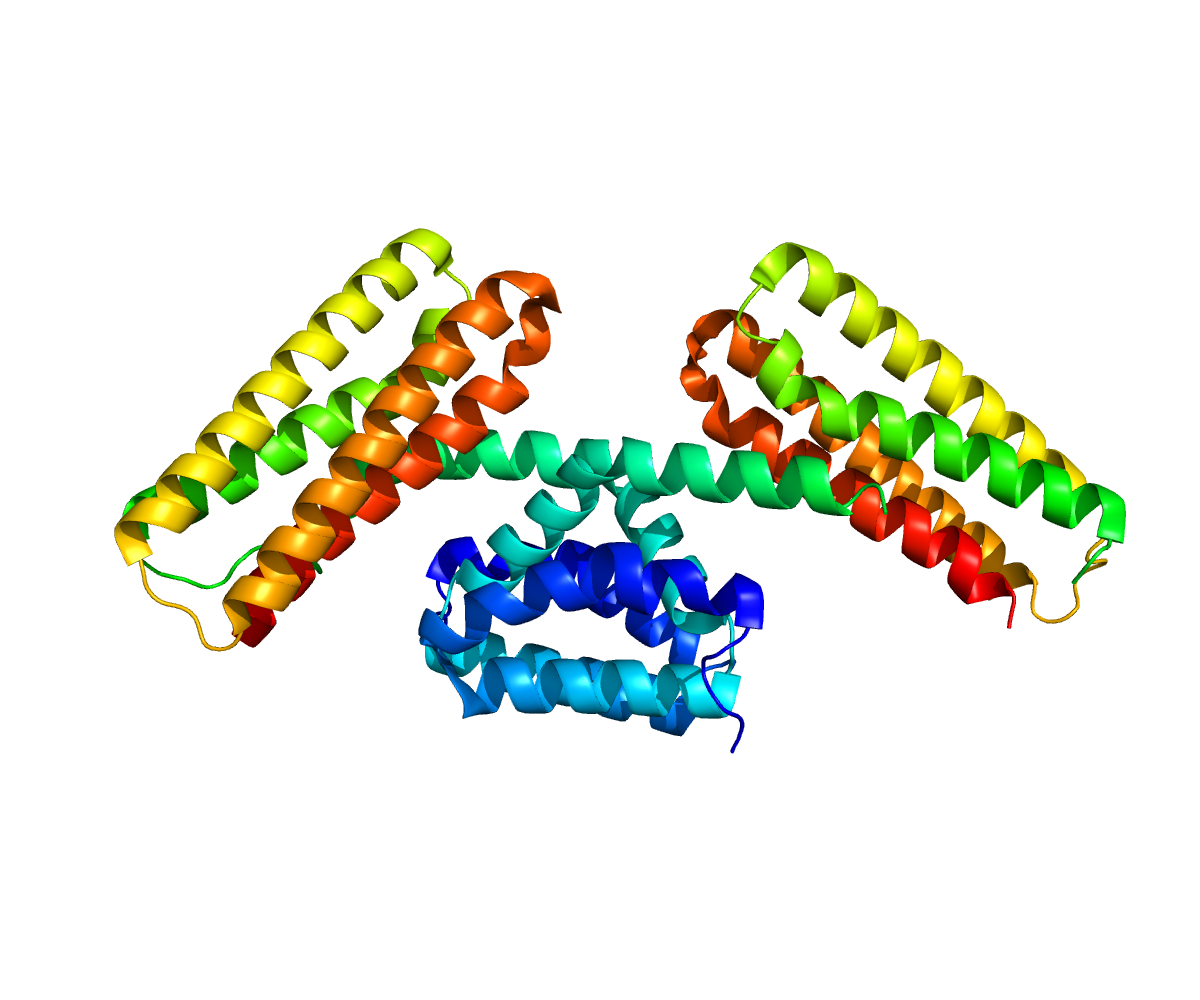

Identifiers
- Aliases: PDCD10, CCM3, TFAR15, programmed cell death 10
- External IDs: OMIM: 609118; MGI: 1928396; GeneCards: PDCD10
Available structures
PDB	Ortholog search: PDBe RCSB
PDB	List of PDB id codes 3AJM, 3L8I, 3L8J, 3RQE, 3RQF, 3RQG, 3W8H, 3W8I, 4GEH, 4TVQ

Gene location (Human)
Chr.	Chromosome 3 (human)
Band	3q26.1	Start	167,683,298 bp
Band	3q26.1	End	167,734,939 bp

Gene location (Mouse)
Chr.	Chromosome 3 (mouse)
Band	3|3 E3	Start	75,423,797 bp
Band	3|3 E3	End	75,464,163 bp
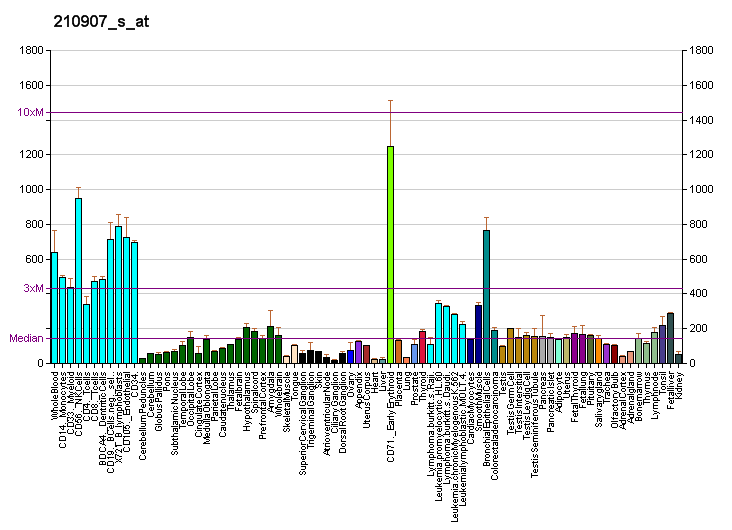
RNA expression pattern
Bgee	Human / Mouse (ortholog); Top expressed in: jejunal mucosa; mucosa of sigmoid colon; trabecular bone; Achilles tendon; oral cavity; epithelium of nasopharynx; palpebral conjunctiva; monocyte; skin of hip; gums / Top expressed in: spermatocyte; spermatid; tail of embryo; facial motor nucleus; granulocyte; morula; Rostral migratory stream; ventricular zone; right kidney; barrel cortex; More reference expression data
BioGPS	More reference expression data
Gene ontology
Molecular function	protein homodimerization activity; protein N-terminus binding; protein binding; protein kinase binding
Cellular component	cytoplasm; cytosol; Golgi apparatus; membrane; Golgi membrane; plasma membrane; extracellular exosome
Biological process	intrinsic apoptotic signaling pathway in response to hydrogen peroxide; positive regulation of MAP kinase activity; positive regulation of cell migration; protein stabilization; negative regulation of apoptotic process; negative regulation of gene expression; establishment of Golgi localization; stress fiber assembly; positive regulation of peptidyl-serine phosphorylation; positive regulation of protein serine/threonine kinase activity; Golgi reassembly; negative regulation of cell migration involved in sprouting angiogenesis; positive regulation of gene expression; angiogenesis; positive regulation of cell population proliferation; negative regulation of blood vessel endothelial cell proliferation involved in sprouting angiogenesis; regulation of Rho protein signal transduction; response to hydrogen peroxide; wound healing, spreading of cells; positive regulation of Notch signaling pathway; positive regulation of stress-activated MAPK cascade; apoptotic process; positive regulation of intracellular protein transport; cellular response to leukemia inhibitory factor
Sources:Amigo / QuickGO
Orthologs
Databases	NCBI: entry; OMA: entry
Species	Human	Mouse
Entrez	11235	56426
Ensembl	ENSG00000114209	ENSMUSG00000027835
UniProt	Q9BUL8	Q8VE70
RefSeq (mRNA)	NM_007217; NM_145859; NM_145860	NM_019745
RefSeq (protein)	NP_009148; NP_665858; NP_665859	NP_062719
Location (UCSC)	Chr 3: 167.68 – 167.73 Mb	Chr 3: 75.42 – 75.46 Mb
PubMed search
- Wikidata
View/Edit Human	View/Edit Mouse

Programmed cell death protein 10 is a protein that in humans is encoded by the PDCD10 gene.

== Function ==
This gene encodes a protein, originally identified in a premyeloid cell line, with similarity to proteins that participate in apoptosis. Three alternative transcripts encoding the same protein, differing only in their 5' UTRs, have been identified for this gene.

== Gene ==
Loss of function mutations in PDCD10 result in the onset of Cerebral Cavernous Malformations (CCM) illness. Therefore, this gene is also called CCM3. Cerebral cavernous malformations (CCMs) are vascular malformations in the brain and spinal cord made of dilated capillary vessels.

== Interactions ==
CCM3 encodes a protein called Programmed Cell Death 10 (PDCD10). The function of this protein has only recently begun to be understood. PDCD10 has roles in vascular development and VEGF signaling1, apoptosis and functions as part of a larger signaling complex that includes germinal center kinase III. Specifically, PDCD10 has been shown to interact with STK26, STK25, STRN, STRN3, MOBKL3, CTTNBP2NL, STK24 and FAM40A.
