= Housekeeping gene =

Gene which maintains basic cellular functions

In molecular biology, housekeeping genes are typically constitutive genes that are required for the maintenance of basic cellular function, and are expressed in all cells of an organism under normal and patho-physiological conditions. Although some housekeeping genes are expressed at relatively constant rates in most non-pathological situations, the expression of other housekeeping genes may vary depending on experimental conditions.

The origin of the term "housekeeping gene" remains obscure. Literature from 1976 used the term to describe specifically tRNA and rRNA. For experimental purposes, the expression of one or multiple housekeeping genes is used as a reference point for the analysis of expression levels of other genes. The key criterion for the use of a housekeeping gene in this manner is that the chosen housekeeping gene is uniformly expressed with low variance under both control and experimental conditions. Validation of housekeeping genes should be performed before their use in gene expression experiments such as RT-PCR. In 2020, a web-based database of human and mouse housekeeping genes and reference genes/transcripts, named Housekeeping and Reference Transcript Atlas (HRT Atlas), was developed to offer updated list of housekeeping genes and reliable candidate reference genes/transcripts for RT-qPCR data normalization. This database can be accessed at http://www.housekeeping.unicamp.br.

== Housekeeping gene regulation ==
Housekeeping genes account for majority of the active genes in the genome, and their expression is obviously vital to survival. The housekeeping gene expression levels are fine-tuned to meet the metabolic requirements in various tissues. Biochemical studies on transcription initiation of the housekeeping gene promoters have been difficult, partly due to the less-characterized promoter motifs and transcription initiation process.

Human housekeeping gene promoters are generally depleted of TATA-box, have high GC content and high incidence of CpG Islands. In Drosophila, where promoter specific CpG Islands are absent, housekeeping gene promoters contain DNA elements like DRE, E-box or DPE. Transcription start sites of housekeeping genes can span over a region of around 100 bp whereas transcription start sites of developmentally regulated genes are usually focused in a narrow region. Little is known about how the dispersed transcription initiation of housekeeping gene is established. There are transcription factors that are specifically enriched on and regulate housekeeping gene promoters. Furthermore, housekeeping promoters are regulated by housekeeping enhancers but not developmentally regulated enhancers.

== Common housekeeping genes in humans ==
The following is a partial list of "housekeeping genes." For a more complete and updated list, see HRT Atlas database compiled by Bidossessi W. Hounkpe et al. The database was constructed by mining more than 12000 human and mouse RNA-seq datasets.

=== Gene expression ===
==== Transcription factors ====
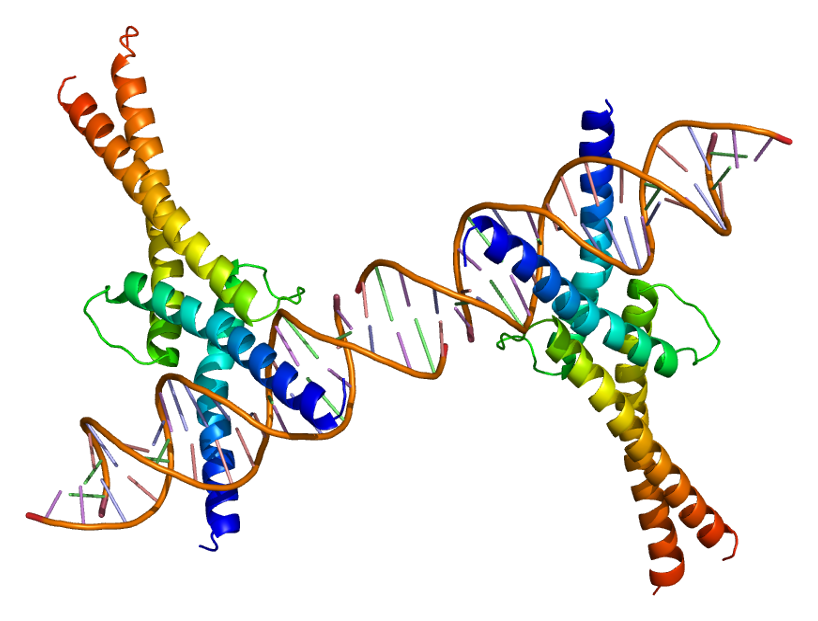
Sterol Regulatory Element Binding Protein

- ATF1 NM_005171
- ATF2 NM_001880
- ATF4 Activating transcription factor 4 NM_001675
- ATF6 NM_007348
- ATF7 NM_001206682
- ATF7IP NM_018179
- BTF3 NM_001207 Homo sapiens basic transcription factor 3
- E2F4 Homo sapiens E2F transcription factor 4, p107/p130-binding (E2F4), mRNA
- ERH (gene) Enhancer of rudimentary homolog of drosophila (which in turn is the first enzymatic step in pyrimidine synthesis. Regulated by MITF)
- HMGB1 High mobility group box binds DNA
- ILF2 Homo sapiens interleukin enhancer binding factor 2, 45kDa (ILF2), mRNA
- IER2 formerly ETR101 Immediate Early Protein?
- JUND Homo sapiens jun D proto-oncogene (JUND), mRNA
- TCEB2 Elongin Matheo er rar

===== Repressors =====
- PUF60 Homo sapiens fuse-binding protein-interacting repressor (SIAHBP1), transcript

==== RNA splicing ====
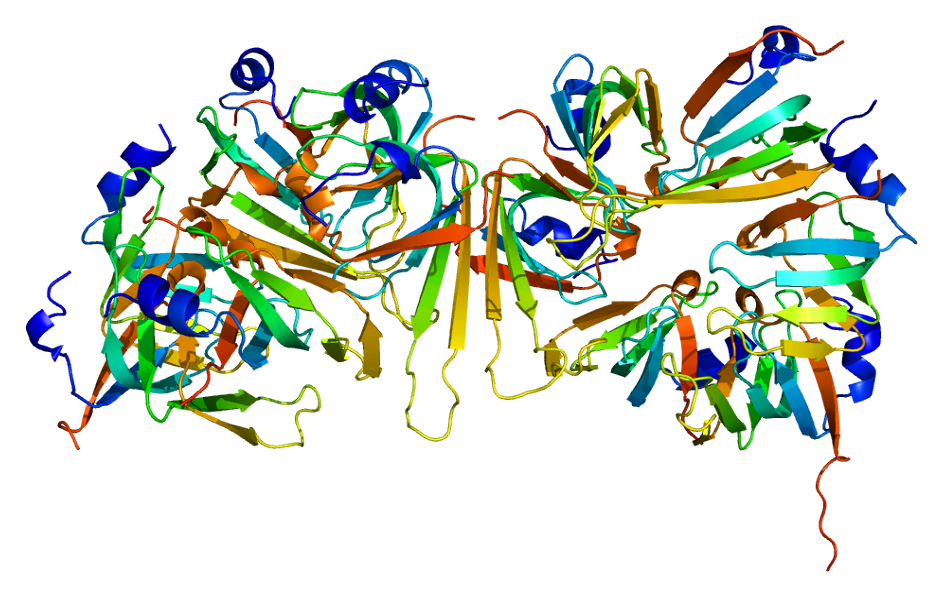
Small nuclear ribonucleoprotein-associated proteins B and B'

- BAT1 aka DDX39B
- HNRPD Homo sapiens heterogeneous nuclear ribonucleoprotein D (AU-rich element RNA
- HNRPK Homo sapiens heterogeneous nuclear ribonucleoprotein K (HNRPK), transcript
- PABPN1 poly(A) binding protein, nuclear 1
- SRSF3 splicing factor, arginine/serine-rich

==== Translation factors ====
- EIF1 aka SUI1
- EIF1AD
- EIF1B
- EIF2A
- EIF2AK1
- EIF2AK3
- EIF2AK4
- EIF2AK1
- EIF2B2
- EIF2B3
- EIF2B4
- EIF2S2
- EIF3A
- EIF3B
- EIF3D formerly EIF3S4
- EIF3G
- EIF3I
- EIF3H
- EIF3J
- EIF3K
- EIF3L
- EIF3M
- EIF3S5
- EIF3S8
- EIF4A1
- EIF4A2
- EIF4A3
- EIF4E2
- EIF4G1
- EIF4G2
- EIF4G3
- EIF4H
- EIF5
- EIF5
- EIF5A
- EIF5AL1
- EIF5B
- EIF6
- TUFM Tu translational elongation factor mitochondrial

===== tRNA synthesis =====
- AARS1 NM_001605 alanyl-tRNA synthetase
- AARS2 NM_020745 alanyl-tRNA synthetase 2, mitochondrial
- AARSD1 NM_001261434 alanyl-tRNA synthetase domain containing 1
- CARS1 NM_001751 cysteinyl-tRNA synthetase
- CARS2 NM_024537 cysteinyl-tRNA synthetase 2, mitochondrial (putative)
- DARS1 NM_001349 aspartyl-tRNA synthetase
- DARS2 NM_018122 aspartyl-tRNA synthetase 2, mitochondrial
- EARS2 NM_001083614 glutamyl-tRNA synthetase 2, mitochondrial
- FARSA NM_004461 phenylalanyl-tRNA synthetase, alpha subunit
- FARSB NM_005687 phenylalanyl-tRNA synthetase, beta subunit
- FARS2 NM_006567 phenylalanyl-tRNA synthetase 2, mitochondrial
- GARS1 NM_002047 glycyl-tRNA synthetase
- HARS1 NM_002109 histidyl-tRNA synthetase
- HARS2 NM_012208 histidyl-tRNA synthetase 2, mitochondrial
- IARS1 NM_002161 isoleucyl-tRNA synthetase
- IARS2 NM_018060 isoleucyl-tRNA synthetase 2, mitochondrial
- KARS1 NM_005548 Homo sapiens lysyl-tRNA synthetase (KARS), mRNA
- LARS2 NM_015340 isoleucyl-tRNA synthetase 2, mitochondrial
- MARS1 NM_004990 methionyl-tRNA synthetase
- MARS2 NM_138395 methionyl-tRNA synthetase 2, mitochondrial
- NARS1 NM_004539 asparaginyl-tRNA synthetase
- NARS2 NM_024678 asparaginyl-tRNA synthetase 2, mitochondrial
- QARS1 NM_005051 glutaminyl-tRNA synthetase
- RARS1 NM_002884 arginyl-tRNA synthetase
- RARS2 NM_020320 arginyl-tRNA synthetase 2, mitochondrial
- SARS1 NM_006513 Homo sapiens seryl-tRNA synthetase (SARS1), mRNA
- TARS1 NM_152295 threonyl-tRNA synthetase
- VARS2 NM_020442 valyl-tRNA synthetase 2, mitochondrial
- WARS2 NM_015836 tryptophanyl tRNA synthetase 2, mitochondrial
- YARS1 NM_003680 Homo sapiens tyrosyl-tRNA synthetase (YARS), mRNA
- YARS2 NM_001040436 Homo sapiens tyrosyl-tRNA synthetase (YARS), mRNA mitochondrial

===== RNA binding protein =====
- ELAVL1

==== Ribosomal proteins ====
- RPL5
- RPL8
- RPL9
- RPL10A
- RPL11
- RPL14
- RPL25
- RPL26L1
- RPL27
- RPL30
- RPL32
- RPL34
- RPL35
- RPL35A
- RPL36AL
- RPS5
- RPS6
- RPS6KA3
- RPS6KB1
- RPS6KB2
- RPS13
- RPS19BP1
- RPS20
- RPS23
- RPS24
- RPS27 transcribed with ubiquitin (see FAU (gene))
- RPN1 Ribophorin anchors the ribosome to rough endoplasmic reticulum

==== Mitochondrial ribosomal proteins ====
- MRPL9
- MRPL1
- MRPL10
- MRPL11
- MRPL12
- MRPL13
- MRPL14
- MRPL15
- MRPL16
- MRPL17
- MRPL18
- MRPL19
- MRPL2
- MRPL20
- MRPL21
- MRPL22
- MRPL23
- MRPL24
- MRPL27
- MRPL28
- MRPL3
- MRPL30
- MRPL32
- MRPL33
- MRPL35
- MRPL36
- MRPL37
- MRPL38
- MRPL4
- MRPL40
- MRPL41
- MRPL42
- MRPL43
- MRPL44
- MRPL45
- MRPL46
- MRPL47
- MRPL48
- MRPL49
- MRPL50
- MRPL51
- MRPL52
- MRPL53
- MRPL54
- MRPL55
- MRPL9
- MRPS10
- MRPS11
- MRPS12
- MRPS14
- MRPS15
- MRPS16
- MRPS17
- MRPS18A
- MRPS18B
- MRPS18C
- MRPS2
- MRPS21
- MRPS22
- MRPS23
- MRPS24
- MRPS25
- MRPS26
- MRPS27
- MRPS28
- MRPS30
- MRPS31
- MRPS33
- MRPS34
- MRPS35
- MRPS5
- MRPS6
- MRPS7
- MRPS9

==== RNA polymerase ====
- POLR1C
- POLR1D
- POLR1E
- POLR2A
- POLR2B
- POLR2C
- POLR2D
- POLR2E
- POLR2F
- POLR2G
- POLR2H
- POLR2I
- POLR2J
- POLR2K
- POLR2L
- POLR3C
- POLR3E
- POLR3GL
- POLR3K

==== Protein processing ====
- PPID Peptidyl-prolyl cis-trans isomerase D
- PPIE Peptidyl-prolyl cis-trans isomerase E
- PPIF Peptidyl-prolyl cis-trans isomerase F
- PPIG Peptidyl-prolyl cis-trans isomerase G
- PPIH Cyclophilin H
- CANX Calnexin. Folding of glycoproteins within endoplasmic reticulum
- CAPN1 Calpain subunit
- CAPN7
- CAPNS1 Calpain protease subunit
- NACA Nascent polypeptide associated complex alpha polypeptide
- NACA2
- PFDN2 Prefoldin 2
- PFDN4 Prefoldin 4
- PFDN5 Prefoldin 5
- PFDN6 Prefoldin 6
- SNX2 Sorting nexin 2
- SNX3 Sorting nexin 3
- SNX4 Sorting nexin 4
- SNX5 Sorting nexin 5
- SNX6 Sorting nexin 6
- SNX9 Sorting nexin 9
- SNX12 Sorting nexin 12
- SNX13 Sorting nexin 13
- SNX17 Sorting nexin 17
- SNX18 Sorting nexin 18
- SNX19 Sorting nexin 19
- SNX25 Sorting nexin 25
- SSR1 Translocon-associated protein TRAPA. Protein translocation in ER
- SSR2 Translocon-associated protein TRAPB. Protein translocation in ER
- SSR3 Translocon-associated protein TRAPG. Protein translocation in ER
- SUMO1 Protein targeting
- SUMO3 Protein targeting

==== Heat shock proteins ====
- HSPA4
- HSPA5
- HSPA8
- HSPA9
- HSPA14
- HSBP1

==== Histone ====
- HIST1H2BC
- H1FX
- H2AFV
- H2AFX
- H2AFY Histone 2 Subfamily
- H2AFZ essential for embryogenesis

==== Cell cycle ====
There is significant overlap in function with regards to some of these proteins. In particular, the Rho-related genes are important in nuclear trafficking (i.e.: mitosis) as well as with mobility along the cytoskeleton in general. These genes of particular interest in cancer research.

- ARHGAP35
- ARHGAP5
- ARHGDIA
- ARHGEF10L Rho guanine nucleotide exchange factor 10L
- ARHGEF11 Rho guanine nucleotide exchange factor 11
- ARHGEF40 Rho guanine nucleotide exchange factor 40
- ARHGEF7 Rho guanine nucleotide exchange factor 7
- RAB10 NM_016131 The small GTPases Rab are key regulators of intracellular membrane trafficking, from the formation of transport vesicles to their fusion with membranes
- RAB11A NM_004663
- RAB11B NM_004218
- RAB14 NM_016322
- RAB18 NM_021252
- RAB1A NM_004161 Homo sapiens RAB1A, member RAS oncogene family (RAB1A), mRNA
- RAB1B NM_030981
- RAB21 NM_014999
- RAB22A NM_020673
- RAB2A NM_002858
- RAB2B NM_001163380
- RAB3GAP1 NM_012233
- RAB3GAP2 NM_012414
- RAB40C NM_021168
- RAB4A NM_004578
- RAB5A NM_004162
- RAB5B NM_002865
- RAB5C NM_004583
- RAB6A NM_002868
- RAB7A NM_004637
- RAB9A NM_004251
- RABEP1 NM_004703
- RABEPK NM_005833
- RABGEF1 NM_014504
- RABGGTA NM_004581
- RABGGTB NM_004582
- CENPB Centromere protein B
- CTBP1 Centromere protein T
- CCNB1IP1 NM_021178 E3 ubiquitin-protein ligase. Modulates cyclin B levels and participates in the regulation of cell cycle progression through the G2 phase
- CCNDBP1 NM_012142 May negatively regulate cell cycle progression
- CCNG1 NM_004060 May play a role in growth regulation
- CCNH NM_001239 Involved in cell cycle control and in RNA transcription by RNA polymerase II. Its expression and activity are constant throughout the cell cycle
- CCNK NM_001099402 Regulatory subunit of cyclin-dependent kinases that mediates phosphorylation of the large subunit of RNA polymerase II
- CCNL1 NM_020307 Transcriptional regulator which participates in regulating the pre-mRNA splicing process
- CCNL2 NM_030937 Transcriptional regulator which participates in regulating the pre-mRNA splicing process. Also modulates the expression of critical apoptotic factor, leading to cell apoptosis.
- CCNY NM_145012 Positive regulatory subunit of the cyclin-dependent kinases CDK14/PFTK1 and CDK16. Acts as a cell-cycle regulator of Wnt signaling pathway during G2/M phase
- PPP1CA NM_002708 Protein phosphatase that associates with over 200 regulatory proteins to form highly specific holoenzymes which dephosphorylate hundreds of biological targets
- PPP1CC NM_002710
- PPP1R10 NM_002714
- PPP1R11 NM_021959 Homo sapiens protein phosphatase 1, regulatory (inhibitor) subunit 11 (PPP1R11),
- PPP1R15B NM_032833
- PPP1R37 NM_019121
- PPP1R7 NM_002712
- PPP1R8 NM_002713
- PPP2CA NM_002715
- PPP2CB NM_001009552
- PPP2R1A NM_014225 Negative regulator of growth and cell divisionHomo sapiens protein phosphatase 2 (formerly 2A), regulatory subunit A (PR 65),
- PPP2R2A NM_002717
- PPP2R2D NM_018461
- PPP2R3C NM_017917
- PPP2R4 NM_021131
- PPP2R5A NM_006243
- PPP2R5B NM_006244
- PPP2R5C NM_002719
- PPP2R5D NM_006245
- PPP2R5E NM_006246
- PPP4C NM_002720
- PPP4R1 NM_005134
- PPP4R2 NM_174907
- PPP5C NM_006247
- PPP6C NM_002721
- PPP6R2 NM_014678
- PPP6R3 NM_018312
- RAD1Homo sapiens ribonuclease/angiogenin inhibitor (RNH), mRNA
- RAD17 NM_002869 Essential for sustained cell growth, maintenance of chromosomal stability, and ATR-dependent checkpoint activation upon DNA damage
- RAD23B NM_002873
- RAD50 NM_005732
- RAD51C NM_002874
- IST1 (locates to central dividing line of dividing cells)

==== Apoptosis ====
- DAD1 Defender against cell death
- DAP3 Involved in mediating interferon-gamma-induced cell death.
- DAXX Death Associated Protein 6

==== Oncogenes ====
- ARAF
- MAZ (gene)
- MYC also considered a transcription factor

==== DNA repair/replication ====
- MCM3AP possibly a primase
- XRCC5 NM_021141 Ku80
- XRCC6 NM_001469 Homo sapiens thyroid autoantigen: Single-stranded DNA-dependent ATP-dependent helicase. Has a role in chromosome translocation.

=== Metabolism ===
- PRKAG1 Senses energy level and inactivates HMGCoA reductase and Acetyl CoA Carboxylase
- PRKAA1 NM_006251 Catalytic subunit of AMP-activated protein kinase (AMPK), an energy sensor protein kinase that plays a key role in regulating cellular energy metabolism
- PRKAB1 NM_006253 Non-catalytic subunit of AMP-activated protein kinase (AMPK), an energy sensor protein kinase that plays a key role in regulating cellular energy metabolism
- PRKACA NM_002730 Phosphorylates a large number of substrates in the cytoplasm and the nucleus.
- PRKAG1 NM_002733 Homo sapiens protein kinase, AMP-activated, gamma 1 non-catalytic subunit (PRKAG1), mRNA
- PRKAR1A NM_002734 Regulatory subunit of the cAMP-dependent protein kinases involved in cAMP signaling in cells
- PRKRIP1 NM_024653 Binds double-stranded RNA. Inhibits EIF2AK2 kinase activity (By similarity).

==== Carbohydrate metabolism ====
- ALDOA
- B3GALT6 NM_080605
- B4GALT3 NM_003779 Homo sapiens UDP-Gal:betaGlcNAc beta 1,4- galactosyltransferase, polypeptide 3
- B4GALT5 NM_004776
- B4GALT7 NM_007255
- GSK3A
- GSK3B
- TPI1
- PGK1 Phosphoglycerate kinase
- PGAM5
- ENOPH1 Enolase phosphatase
- LDHA Lactate dehydrogenase
- TALDO1 Transaldolase in pentose shunt
- TSTA3 Mannose metabolism

==== Citric Acid Cycle ====
- SDHA NM_004168 Succinate Dehydrogenase subunit A
- SDHAF2 NM_017841
- SDHB NM_002973 Iron-sulfur protein (IP) subunit of succinate dehydrogenase (SDH) that is involved in complex II of the mitochondrial electron transport chain and is responsible for transferring electrons from succinate to ubiquinone (coenzyme Q)
- SDHC NM_003000 Membrane-anchoring subunit of succinate dehydrogenase (SDH) that is involved in complex II of the mitochondrial electron transport chain and is responsible for transferring electrons from succinate to ubiquinone (coenzyme Q).
- SDHD NM_003001

==== Lipid metabolism ====
- HADHA Trifunctional protein subunit alpha

==== Amino acid metabolism ====
- COMT Catechol-O-methyl transferase)

==== NADH dehydrogenase ====
- NDUFA2NM_002488
- NDUFA3 NM_004542
- NDUFA4 NM_002489
- NDUFA5 NM_005000
- NDUFA6 NM_002490
- NDUFA7 NM_005001 Homo sapiens NADH dehydrogenase (ubiquinone) 1 alpha subcomplex, 7, 14.5kDa
- NDUFA8 NM_014222
- NDUFA9 NM_005002
- NDUFA10 NM_004544
- NDUFA11 NM_175614
- NDUFA12 NM_018838
- NDUFA13 NM_015965
- NDUFAF2 NM_174889
- NDUFAF3 NM_199069
- NDUFAF4 NM_014165
- NDUFB2 NM_004546
- NDUFB3 NM_002491
- NDUFB4 NM_004547
- NDUFB5 NM_002492
- NDUFB6 NM_002493
- NDUFB7 NM_004146 Homo sapiens NADH dehydrogenase (ubiquinone) 1 beta subcomplex, 7, 18kDa
- NDUFB10 NM_004548
- NDUFB11 NM_019056
- NDUFB8 NM_005004
- NDUFB9 NM_005005
- NDUFC1 NM_002494Homo sapiens NADH dehydrogenase (ubiquinone) 1, subcomplex unknown, 1, 6kDa
- NDUFC2 NM_004549
- NDUFC2-KCTD14 NM_001203260
- NDUFS5
- NDUFV2
- NDUFS2 NM_004550
- NDUFS3 NM_004551
- NDUFS4 NM_002495
- NDUFS5 NM_004552 Homo sapiens NADH dehydrogenase (ubiquinone) Fe-S protein 5, 15kDa
- NDUFS6 NM_004553
- NDUFS7 NM_024407
- NDUFS8 NM_002496
- NDUFV1 NM_007103 Homo sapiens NADH dehydrogenase (ubiquinone) flavoprotein 1, 51kDa (NDUFV1),
- NDUFV2 NM_021074 Homo sapiens NADH dehydrogenase (ubiquinone) flavoprotein 2, 24kDa (NDUFV2),

==== Cytochrome C oxidase ====
(Note that COX1, COX2, and COX3 are mitochondrially encoded)

- COX4I1 001861
- COX5B NM_001862
- COX6B1 NM_001863
- COX6C NM_004374
- COX7A2 NM_001865 Homo sapiens cytochrome c oxidase subunit VIIa polypeptide 2 (liver) (COX7A2),
- COX7A2L NM_004718
- COX7C NM_001867
- COX8
- COX8A NM_004074 Homo sapiens cytochrome c oxidase subunit VIII (COX8), nuclear gene encoding
- COX11 NM_004375
- COX14 NM_032901
- COX15 NM_004376
- COX16 NM_016468
- COX19 NM_001031617
- COX20 NM_198076
- CYC1 Homo sapiens cytochrome c-1 (CYC1)
- UQCC NM_018244 Required for the assembly of the ubiquinol-cytochrome c reductase complex (mitochondrial respiratory chain complex III or cytochrome b-c1 complex)
- UQCR10 NM_013387
- UQCR11 NM_006830 Homo sapiens ubiquinol-cytochrome c reductase (6.4kD) subunit (UQCR), mRNA
- UQCRB NM_006294
- UQCRC1 NM_003365 Homo sapiens ubiquinol-cytochrome c reductase core protein I (UQCRC1), mRNA
- UQCRC2 NM_003366
- UQCRHL NM_001089591
- UQCRQ NM_014402 Homo sapiens low molecular mass ubiquinone-binding protein (9.5kD) (QP-C), mRNA

==== ATPase ====
- ATP2C1 NM_014382
- ATP5F1A NM_004046 Homo sapiens ATP synthase, H+ transporting, mitochondrial F1 complex, alpha
- ATP5F1B NM_001686
- ATP5F1C NM_005174
- ATP5F1D NM_001687 Homo sapiens ATP synthase, H+ transporting, mitochondrial F1 complex, delta
- ATP5F1 NM_001688
- ATP5MC2 NM_005176
- ATP5MC3 NM_001689 Homo sapiens ATP synthase, H+ transporting, mitochondrial F0 complex, subunit c
- ATP5PD NM_006356 Homo sapiens ATP synthase, H+ transporting, mitochondrial F0 complex, subunit d
- ATP5PF NM_001685
- ATP5MF NM_004889 Homo sapiens ATP synthase, H+ transporting, mitochondrial F0 complex, subunit f,
- ATP5MF-PTCD1 NM_001198879
- ATP5MG NM_006476
- ATP5PO NM_001697 Homo sapiens ATP synthase, H+ transporting, mitochondrial F1 complex, O subunit
- ATP5S NM_015684
- ATP5SL NM_018035
- ATP6AP1 NM_001183 Homo sapiens ATPase, H+ transporting, lysosomal interacting protein 1 (ATP6IP1),
- ATP6V0A2 NM_012463
- ATP6V0B NM_004047 Homo sapiens ATPase, H+ transporting, lysosomal 21kDa, V0 subunit c (ATP6V0B),
- ATP6V0C NM_001694 Homo sapiens ATPase, H+ transporting, lysosomal 16kDa, V0 subunit c (ATP6V0C),
- ATP6V0D1 NM_004691
- ATP6V0E1 NM_003945
- ATP6V1C1 NM_001695
- ATP6V1D NM_015994
- ATP6V1E1 NM_001696 Homo sapiens ATPase, H+ transporting, lysosomal 31kDa, V1 subunit E isoform 1
- ATP6V1F NM_004231 Homo sapiens ATPase, H+ transporting, lysosomal 14kDa, V1 subunit F (ATP6V1F),
- ATP6V1G1 NM_004888 Homo sapiens ATPase, H+ transporting, lysosomal 13kDa, V1 subunit G isoform 1
- ATP6V1H NM_015941
- ATPAF2 NM_145691
- ATPIF1 NM_016311

==== Lysosome ====
- CTSD can degrade insulin in hepatocytes
- CSTB May protect cell from leaking lysosomes
- LAMP1
- LAMP2
- M6PR

==== Proteasome ====
- PSMA1 NM_002786
- PSMA2 NM_002787
- PSMA3 NM_002788
- PSMA4 NM_002789
- PSMA5 NM_002790
- PSMA6 NM_002791
- PSMA7 NM_002792 Homo sapiens proteasome (prosome, macropain) subunit, alpha type, 7 (PSMA7),
- PSMB1 NM_002793 Homo sapiens proteasome (prosome, macropain) subunit, beta type, 1 (PSMB1), mRNA
- PSMB2 NM_002794 Homo sapiens proteasome (prosome, macropain) subunit, beta type, 2 (PSMB2), mRNA
- PSMB3 NM_002795
- PSMB4 NM_002796 Homo sapiens proteasome (prosome, macropain) subunit, beta type, 4 (PSMB4), mRNA
- PSMB5 NM_002797
- PSMB6 NM_002798
- PSMB7 NM_002799 Homo sapiens proteasome (prosome, macropain) subunit, beta type, 7 (PSMB7), mRNA
- PSMC2 NM_002803
- PSMC3 NM_002804
- PSMC4 NM_006503
- PSMC5 NM_002805
- PSMC6 NM_002806
- PSMD1 NM_002807
- PSMD10 NM_002814
- PSMD11 NM_002815 Homo sapiens proteasome (prosome, macropain) 26S subunit, non-ATPase, 11
- PSMD12 NM_002816
- PSMD13 NM_002817
- PSMD14 NM_005805
- PSMD2 NM_002808
- PSMD3 NM_002809
- PSMD4 NM_002810
- PSMD5 NM_005047
- PSMD6 NM_014814
- PSMD7 NM_002811
- PSMD8 NM_002812 Homo sapiens proteasome (prosome, macropain) 26S subunit, non-ATPase, 8 (PSMD8),
- PSMD9 NM_002813
- PSME2 NM_002818 Homo sapiens proteasome (prosome, macropain) activator subunit 2 (PA28 beta)
- PSME3 NM_005789
- PSMF1 NM_006814
- PSMG2 NM_020232
- PSMG3 NM_032302
- PSMG4 NM_001128591
- UBA1 NM_003334 Homo sapiens ubiquitin-activating enzyme E1 (A1S9T and BN75 temperature
- UBA2 NM_005499
- UBA3 NM_003968
- UBA5 NM_024818
- UBA52 NM_003333
- UBAC2 NM_177967
- UBALD1 NM_145253
- UBAP1 NM_016525
- UBAP2L NM_014847
- UBB NM_018955 Homo sapiens ubiquitin B (UBB), mRNA
- UBC NM_021009 Homo sapiens ubiquitin C (UBC), mRNA
- UBE2A NM_003336
- UBE2B NM_003337
- UBE2D2 NM_003339 Homo sapiens ubiquitin-conjugating enzyme E2D 2 (UBC4/5 homolog, yeast)
- UBE2D3 NM_003340
- UBE2D4 NM_015983
- UBE2E1 NM_003341
- UBE2E2 NM_152653
- UBE2E3 NM_006357
- UBE2F NM_080678
- UBE2G2 NM_003343
- UBE2H NM_003344
- UBE2I NM_003345 Homo sapiens ubiquitin-conjugating enzyme E2I (UBC9 homolog, yeast) (UBE2I),
- UBE2J1 NM_016021
- UBE2J2 NM_058167
- UBE2K NM_005339
- UBE2L3 NM_003347
- UBE2M NM_003969 Homo sapiens ubiquitin-conjugating enzyme E2M (UBC12 homolog, yeast) (UBE2M),
- UBE2N NM_003348
- UBE2NL NM_001012989
- UBE2Q1 NM_017582
- UBE2R2 NM_017811
- UBE2V1 NM_021988
- UBE2V2 NM_003350
- UBE2W NM_018299
- UBE2Z NM_023079
- UBE3A NM_000462
- UBE3B NM_130466
- UBE3C NM_014671
- UBE4A NM_004788
- UBE4B NM_006048
- USP10 NM_005153
- USP14 NM_005151
- USP16 NM_006447
- USP19 NM_006677
- USP22 NM_015276
- USP25 NM_013396
- USP27X NM_001145073
- USP33 NM_015017
- USP38 NM_032557
- USP39 NM_006590
- USP4 NM_003363
- USP47 NM_017944
- USP5 NM_003481
- USP7 NM_003470
- USP8 NM_005154
- USP9X NM_001039590

==== Ribonuclease ====
- RNH Ribonuclease inhibitor

==== Thioreductase ====
- TXN2 NM_012473
- TXNDC11 NM_015914
- TXNDC12 NM_015913
- TXNDC15 NM_024715
- TXNDC17 NM_032731
- TXNDC9 NM_005783
- TXNL1 NM_004786
- TXNL4A NM_006701
- TXNL4B NM_017853
- TXNRD1 NM_003330

=== Structural ===
==== Cytoskeletal ====
- ANXA6
- ANXA7
- ARPC1A Actin-related peptide
- ARPC2
- ARPC5L
- CAPZA2
- CAPZB
- RHOA also implicated in regulation of cell cycle
- RHOB
- RHOT1 mitochondrial trafficking
- RHOT2
- TUBB Tubulin, beta polypeptide
- WDR1 actin disassembly?

==== Organelle synthesis ====
A specialized form of cell signaling

- BLOC1S1
- BLOC1S2NM_173809
- BLOC1S3NM_212550
- BLOC1S4NM_018366
- BLOC1S6NM_012388
- AP1G1 NM_001128
- AP1M1 NM_032493
- AP2A1 NM_014203
- AP2A2 NM_012305
- AP2M1
- AP2S1 NM_004069
- AP3B1 NM_003664
- AP3D1 NM_003938
- AP3M1 NM_012095
- AP3S1 NM_001284
- AP3S2 NM_005829
- AP4B1 NM_006594
- AP5M1 NM_018229
- ANXA6 Annexin 6
- ANXA7 Annexin 7
- AP1B1 Coated vesicles
- CLTA Clathrin A (vesicles)
- CLTB Clathrin B (vesicles)
- CLTC

==== Mitochondrion ====
- MTX2

=== Surface ===
- AP2S1
- CD81
- GPAA1
- LGALS9
- MGAT2
- MGAT4B
- VAMP3

==== Cell adhesion ====
- CTNNA1 NM_001903
- CTNNB1
- CTNNBIP1 NM_020248
- CTNNBL1 NM_030877
- CTNND1 NM_001085458 delta catenin

==== Channels and transporters ====
- ABCB10 NM_012089
- ABCB7 NM_004299
- ABCD3 NM_002857
- ABCE1 NM_002939
- ABCF1 NM_001090
- ABCF2 NM_005692
- ABCF3 NM_018358
- CALM1 Calmodulin grasps calcium ions
- MFSD11 NM_024311 similar to MSFD10 aka TETRAN or tetracycline transporter-like protein
- MFSD12 NM_174983
- MFSD3 NM_138431
- MFSD5 NM_032889
- SLC15A4 NM_145648
- SLC20A1 NM_005415
- SLC25A11 mitochondrial oxoglutarate/malate carrier
- SLC25A26 NM_173471
- SLC25A28 NM_031212
- SLC25A3 NM_002635
- SLC25A32 NM_030780
- SLC25A38 NM_017875
- SLC25A39 NM_016016
- SLC25A44 NM_014655
- SLC25A46 NM_138773
- SLC25A5 NM_001152
- SLC27A4 NM_005094
- SLC30A1 NM_021194
- SLC30A5 NM_022902
- SLC30A9 NM_006345
- SLC35A2 NM_005660
- SLC35A4 NM_080670
- SLC35B1 NM_005827
- SLC35B2 NM_178148
- SLC35C2 NM_015945
- SLC35E1 NM_024881
- SLC35E3 NM_018656
- SLC35F5 NM_025181
- SLC38A2 NM_018976
- SLC39A1 NM_014437
- SLC39A3 NM_144564
- SLC39A7 NM_006979
- SLC41A3 NM_017836
- SLC46A3 NM_181785
- SLC48A1 NM_017842

==== Receptors ====
- ACVR1 NM_001105 similar to ACVRL1 TGF Beta receptor family Rendu-Osler-Weber syndrome
- ACVR1B NM_004302
- CD23 FCER2 low affinity IgE receptor (lectin)

==== HLA/immunoglobulin/cell recognition ====
- BAT1 aka DDX39B which is involved in RNA splicing
- BSG Basigin Immunoglobulin Superfamily, extracellular metalloproteinase
- MIF macrophage migration inhibitory factor
- TAPBP

=== Kinases/signalling ===
- ADRBK1 can downregulate response to epinephrine
- AGPAT1 acyl 3 phosphoglycerol acyl transferase
- ARF1
- ARF3
- ARF4
- ARF5
- ARL2 RAS Superfamily
- CSF1 Colony stimulating factor not highly expressed constitutively at 5-12
- CSK C-src tyrosine kinase
- DCT dopachrome tautomerase
- EFNA3
- FKBP1A
- GDI1 GDP Dissociation inhibitor (Rab family)
- GNAS1 ubiquitously expressed, but differentially imprinted
- GNAI2
- HAX1 associated with tyrosine kinases
- ILK Integrin linked kinase
- MAPKAPK2
- MAP2K2
- MAP3K11
- PITPNM Phosphatidylinositol transfer protein
- RAC1 Ro GTPase involved with many signaling pathways
- RAP1B GTPase involved with cell adhesion
- RAGA Ras-related GTP Binding
- STK24 Serine/Threonine Kinase
- STK25
- WHR1
- YWHAB Tyrosine 3-monooxygenase/tryptophan 5-monooxygenase activation protein, beta polypeptide
- YWHAH Tyrosine 3-monooxygenase/tryptophan 5-monooxygenase activation protein, h polypeptide
- YWHAQ Tyrosine 3-monooxygenase/tryptophan 5-monooxygenase activation protein, theta polypeptide
- YWHAZ Tyrosine 3-monooxygenase/tryptophan 5-monooxygenase activation protein, zeta polypeptide

==== Growth factors ====
- AIF1
- HDGF Hepatoma derived growth factor (translocates to nucleus)
- HGS
- LTBP4
- VEGFB
- ZFP36L1

==== Tissue necrosis factor ====
- CD40 formerly TNFRSF5

==== Casein kinase ====
- CSNK1E
- CSNK2B

=== Miscellaneous ===
- ALAS1 Aminolevulinic Acid Synthase type 1 (type 2 is erythroid and associated with porphyria)
- ARHGEF2 Rho guanine nucleotide exchange factor
- ARMET Mesencephalic astrocyte-derived neurotrophic factor
- AES amino terminal enhancer of split
- BECN1 involved in autophagy and partners with PI3K
- BUD31 formerly Maternal G10 transcript
- Creatine kinase CKB (ATP reservoir)
- Cytidine deaminase questionable: not present in very high levels at all
- CPNE1
- ENSA (gene)
- FTH1 Heavy chain of Ferritin
- GDI2 rab/ras vesicular trafficking
- GUK1 Guanylate kinase transfers phosphate from ATP to GMP
- HPRT Hypoxanthine-guanine phosphoribosyltransferase
- IFITM1 Induced by interferon, transmembrane protein
- JTB (gene) Jumping translocation breakpoint
- MMPL2
- NME2 (formerly NM23B) Nucleoside diphosphate kinase
- NONO
- P4HB
- PRDX1 peroxiredoxin (reduces peroxides)
- PTMA Prothymosin
- RPA2 Binds DNA during replication to keep it straightened out
- SULT1A3 Sulfate conjugation (note: SULT1C is cited in earlier literature as being ubiquitous but this may be an example of different tags being used to refer to a common area of 2 closely related genes. If the tag is too short, then it may not be specific enough to truly specify one member of a gene family from another)
- SYNGR2 Synaptogyrin (may participate in vesicle translocation)
- Tetratricopeptide, TTC1 small glutamine rich tetratricopeptide

==== Open_reading_frame ====
- C11Orf13
- C14orf2
- GATD3

==== Sperm/Testis ====
Although this page is devoted to genes that should be ubiquitously expressed, this section is for genes whose current name reflects their relative upregulation in testes

- SPAG7
- SRM Spermidine synthase
- TEGT Bax-1 inhibitor
- DAZAP2 Deleted in azoospermia
- MEA1 Male enhanced antigen

== See also ==
- Inducible gene
- Genevestigator
- Spatiotemporal gene expression
- Essential proteins in protein complexes
- Gene
- Genome
- Minimal genome
- List of gene families
