= CTNNBL1 =

Protein-coding gene in the species Homo sapiens

Identifiers
- Aliases: CTNNBL1, C20orf33, NAP, P14L, PP8304, dJ633O20.1, catenin beta like 1, IMD99
- External IDs: OMIM: 611537; MGI: 1913892; GeneCards: CTNNBL1
Available structures
PDB	Ortholog search: PDBe RCSB
PDB	List of PDB id codes 4CB8, 4CB9, 4CBA, 4HM9, 4HNM, 4MFU, 4MFV

Gene location (Human)
Chr.	Chromosome 20 (human)
Band	20q11.23	Start	37,693,955 bp
Band	20q11.23	End	37,872,129 bp

Gene location (Mouse)
Chr.	Chromosome 2 (mouse)
Band	2 H1|2 78.4 cM	Start	157,579,321 bp
Band	2 H1|2 78.4 cM	End	157,733,534 bp
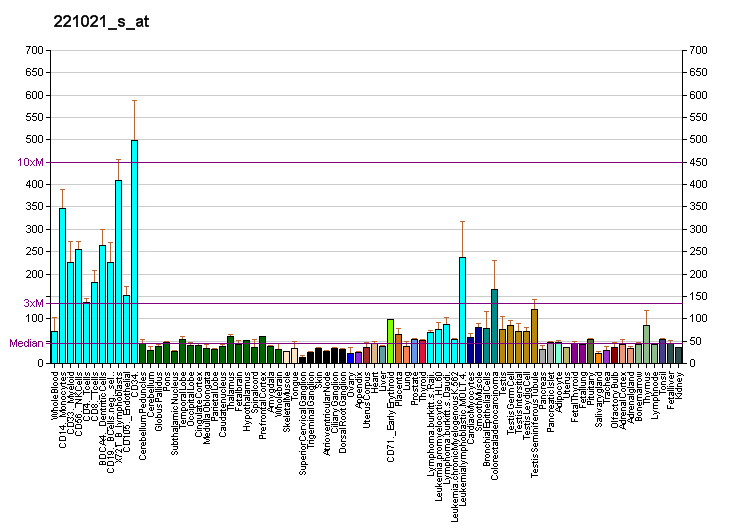
RNA expression pattern
Bgee	Human / Mouse (ortholog); Top expressed in: left testis; right testis; spleen; monocyte; ganglionic eminence; apex of heart; granulocyte; ventricular zone; right auricle of heart; muscle layer of sigmoid colon / Top expressed in: otic vesicle; spermatid; primary oocyte; saccule; spermatocyte; otic placode; primitive streak; seminiferous tubule; renal corpuscle; medullary collecting duct; More reference expression data
BioGPS	More reference expression data
Gene ontology
Molecular function	enzyme binding; protein binding
Cellular component	cytoplasm; spliceosomal complex; membrane; nucleus; Prp19 complex; nucleoplasm
Biological process	positive regulation of apoptotic process; mRNA splicing, via spliceosome; mRNA processing; somatic diversification of immunoglobulins; apoptotic process; RNA splicing
Sources:Amigo / QuickGO
Orthologs
Databases	NCBI: entry; OMA: entry
Species	Human	Mouse
Entrez	56259	66642
Ensembl	ENSG00000132792	ENSMUSG00000027649
UniProt	Q8WYA6	Q9CWL8
RefSeq (mRNA)	NM_001281495; NM_030877	NM_025680
RefSeq (protein)	NP_001268424; NP_110517	NP_079956
Location (UCSC)	Chr 20: 37.69 – 37.87 Mb	Chr 2: 157.58 – 157.73 Mb
PubMed search
- Wikidata
View/Edit Human	View/Edit Mouse

Beta-catenin-like protein 1 is a protein that in humans is encoded by the CTNNBL1 gene.

The protein encoded by this gene contains an acidic domain, a putative bipartite nuclear localization signal, a nuclear export signal, a leucine-isoleucine zipper, and phosphorylation motifs. In addition, the encoded protein contains Armadillo/beta-catenin-like repeats, which have been implicated in protein-protein interactions. Although the function of this protein has not been determined, the C-terminal portion of the protein has been shown to possess apoptosis-inducing activity. It is a housekeeping gene.
