= EIF5AL1 =

Protein-coding gene in the species Homo sapiens

Identifiers
- Aliases: EIF5AL1, EIF5AP1, bA342M3.3, eukaryotic translation initiation factor 5A-like 1, EIF5A, eIF-5A, eIF-5A1, eIF-4D, eIF-5A-1, eukaryotic translation initiation factor 5A like 1
- External IDs: GeneCards: EIF5AL1

Gene location (Human)
Chr.	Chromosome 10 (human)
Band	10q22.3	Start	79,512,533 bp
Band	10q22.3	End	79,516,440 bp
RNA expression pattern
Bgee	Human / Mouse (ortholog); Top expressed in: testicle; left testis; right testis; thymus; mucosa of transverse colon; stromal cell of endometrium; bone marrow cell; muscle of thigh; liver; gastrocnemius muscle / n/a; More reference expression data
BioGPS	n/a
Gene ontology
Molecular function	translation elongation factor activity; RNA binding; ribosome binding
Cellular component	nuclear pore; endoplasmic reticulum membrane; nucleus; membrane; cytoplasm; endoplasmic reticulum
Biological process	protein transport; translational frameshifting; positive regulation of translational elongation; translational elongation; mRNA transport; protein biosynthesis; positive regulation of translational termination
Sources:Amigo / QuickGO
Orthologs
Databases	NCBI: entry; OMA: entry
Species	Human	Mouse
Entrez	143244	n/a
Ensembl	ENSG00000253626	n/a
UniProt	Q6IS14	n/a
RefSeq (mRNA)	NM_001099692	n/a
RefSeq (protein)	NP_001093162	n/a
Location (UCSC)	Chr 10: 79.51 – 79.52 Mb	n/a
PubMed search		n/a
- Wikidata
View/Edit Human

Eukaryotic translation initiation factor 5A-1-like is a protein that in humans is encoded by the gene EIF5AL1 (previously EIF5AP1). The EIF5AL1 protein is predicted to be involved in translational elongation.
