= PPP2R3C =

Protein-coding gene in the species Homo sapiens

Identifiers
- Aliases: PPP2R3C, C14orf10, G4-1, G5pr, SPGF36, GDRM, protein phosphatase 2 regulatory subunit B''gamma
- External IDs: OMIM: 615902; MGI: 1930009; GeneCards: PPP2R3C

Gene location (Mouse)
Chr.	Chromosome 12 (mouse)
Band	12|12 C1	Start	55,278,991 bp
Band	12|12 C1	End	55,302,998 bp
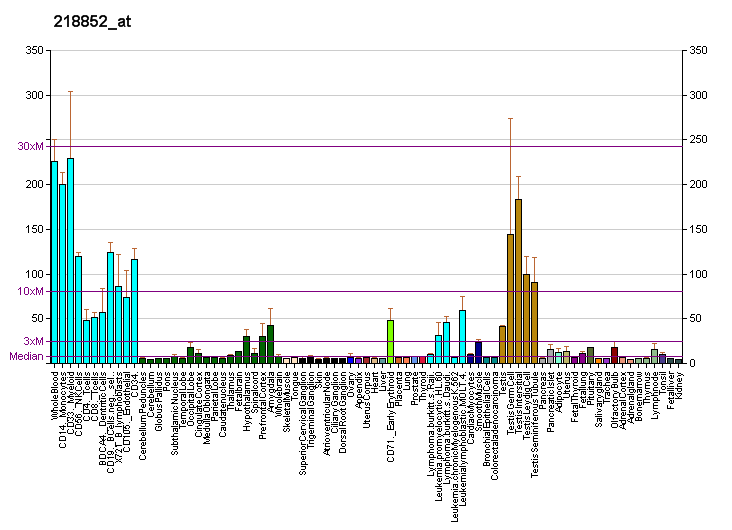
RNA expression pattern
Bgee	Human / Mouse (ortholog); Top expressed in: ganglionic eminence; monocyte; sperm; blood; Achilles tendon; anterior pituitary; bone marrow; spleen; amygdala; prefrontal cortex / Top expressed in: spermatocyte; spermatid; ventricular zone; granulocyte; muscle of thigh; embryo; zygote; embryo; genital tubercle; tail of embryo; More reference expression data
BioGPS	More reference expression data
Gene ontology
Molecular function	protein binding; metal ion binding
Cellular component	cytoplasm; centrosome; spindle; nucleus; Golgi apparatus; cytosol
Biological process	positive regulation of B cell differentiation; regulation of B cell activation; cortical cytoskeleton organization; B cell homeostasis; spleen development; activation of protein kinase activity; microtubule cytoskeleton organization; regulation of mitochondrial depolarization; regulation of antimicrobial humoral response; T cell homeostasis; regulation of dephosphorylation
Sources:Amigo / QuickGO
Orthologs
Databases	NCBI: entry
Species	Human	Mouse
Entrez	55012	59032
Ensembl	n/a	ENSMUSG00000021022
UniProt	Q969Q6	Q9JK24
RefSeq (mRNA)	NM_001305155; NM_001305156; NM_017917	NM_021529
RefSeq (protein)	NP_001292084; NP_001292085; NP_060387	NP_067504
Location (UCSC)	n/a	Chr 12: 55.28 – 55.3 Mb
PubMed search
- Wikidata
View/Edit Human	View/Edit Mouse

Serine/threonine-protein phosphatase 2A regulatory subunit B'' subunit gamma is an enzyme that in humans is encoded by the PPP2R3C gene.
