= MRPL55 =

Protein-coding gene in humans

Identifiers
- Aliases: MRPL55, AAVG5835, L55nt, MRP-L55, PRO19675, mitochondrial ribosomal protein L55
- External IDs: OMIM: 611859; MGI: 1914462; GeneCards: MRPL55
Available structures
PDB	Ortholog search: PDBe RCSB
PDB	List of PDB id codes 3J9M

Gene location (Human)
Chr.	Chromosome 1 (human)
Band	1q42.13	Start	228,106,679 bp
Band	1q42.13	End	228,109,312 bp

Gene location (Mouse)
Chr.	Chromosome 11 (mouse)
Band	11|11 B1.3	Start	59,093,312 bp
Band	11|11 B1.3	End	59,096,960 bp
RNA expression pattern
Bgee	Human / Mouse (ortholog); Top expressed in: apex of heart; prefrontal cortex; right lobe of liver; Brodmann area 9; anterior cingulate cortex; olfactory zone of nasal mucosa; muscle of thigh; anterior pituitary; right adrenal gland; left adrenal cortex / Top expressed in: right ventricle; digastric muscle; right kidney; temporal muscle; sternocleidomastoid muscle; yolk sac; myocardium of ventricle; blastocyst; morula; cardiac muscle tissue of left ventricle; More reference expression data
BioGPS	n/a
Gene ontology
Molecular function	structural constituent of ribosome
Cellular component	ribosome; mitochondrion; mitochondrial inner membrane; mitochondrial large ribosomal subunit
Biological process	mitochondrial translational elongation; protein biosynthesis; mitochondrial translational termination
Sources:Amigo / QuickGO
Orthologs
Databases	NCBI: entry; OMA: entry
Species	Human	Mouse
Entrez	128308	67212
Ensembl	ENSG00000162910	ENSMUSG00000036860
UniProt	Q7Z7F7	Q9CZ83
RefSeq (mRNA)	NM_181441; NM_181454; NM_181455; NM_181456; NM_181462 NM_181463; NM_181464; NM_181465; NM_001321284	NM_001302334; NM_001302335; NM_001302336; NM_026035; NM_001362908 NM_001362909
RefSeq (protein)	NP_001308213; NP_852106; NP_852119; NP_852120; NP_852121 NP_852127; NP_852128; NP_852129; NP_852130	NP_001289263; NP_001289264; NP_001289265; NP_080311; NP_001349837 NP_001349838
Location (UCSC)	Chr 1: 228.11 – 228.11 Mb	Chr 11: 59.09 – 59.1 Mb
PubMed search
- Wikidata
View/Edit Human	View/Edit Mouse

39S ribosomal protein L55, mitochondrial is a protein that in humans is encoded by the MRPL55 gene.

Mammalian mitochondrial ribosomal proteins are encoded by nuclear genes and help in protein synthesis within the mitochondrion. Mitochondrial ribosomes (mitoribosomes) consist of a small 28S subunit and a large 39S subunit. They have an estimated 75% protein to rRNA composition compared to prokaryotic ribosomes, where this ratio is reversed. Another difference between mammalian mitoribosomes and prokaryotic ribosomes is that the latter contain a 5S rRNA. Among different species, the proteins comprising the mitoribosome differ greatly in sequence, and sometimes in biochemical properties, which prevents easy recognition by sequence homology. This gene encodes a 39S subunit protein. Multiple transcript variants encoding two different isoforms were identified through sequence analysis.
