= RNA polymerase II subunit B4 =

Protein-coding gene in the species Homo sapiens

POLR2D
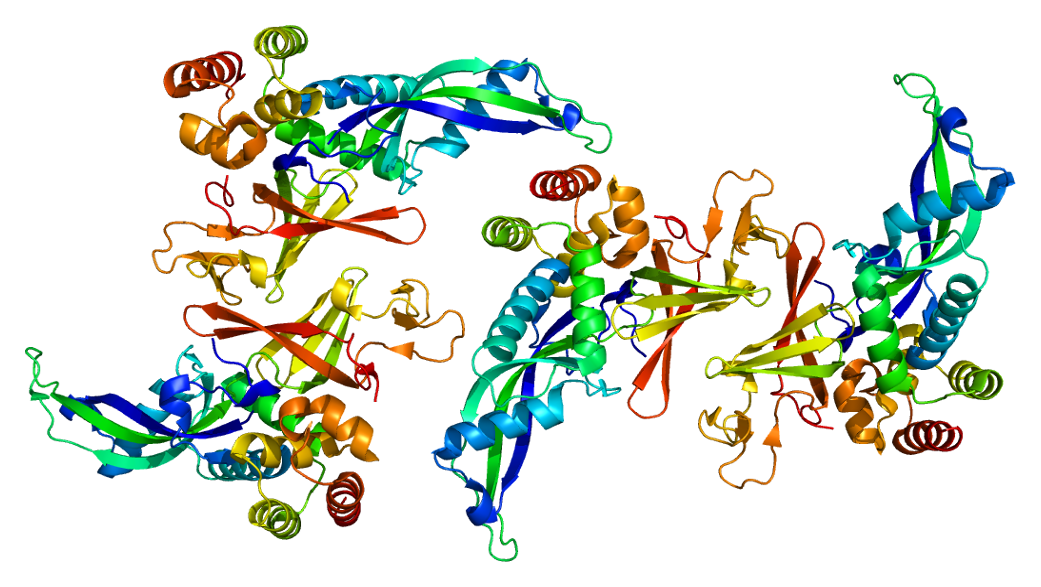

Identifiers
- Aliases: POLR2D, HSRBP4, HSRPB4, RBP4, RPB16, RNA polymerase II subunit B4, polymerase (RNA) II subunit D, RNA polymerase II subunit D, RPB4
- External IDs: OMIM: 606017; MGI: 1916491; GeneCards: POLR2D
Available structures
PDB	Ortholog search: PDBe RCSB
PDB	List of PDB id codes 2C35, 5IYD, 5IY8, 5IYC, 5IY6, 5IY7, 5IYA, 5IY9, 5IYB

Gene location (Human)
Chr.	Chromosome 2 (human)
Band	2q14.3	Start	127,843,553 bp
Band	2q14.3	End	127,858,155 bp

Gene location (Mouse)
Chr.	Chromosome 18 (mouse)
Band	18|18 B1	Start	31,922,212 bp
Band	18|18 B1	End	31,929,754 bp
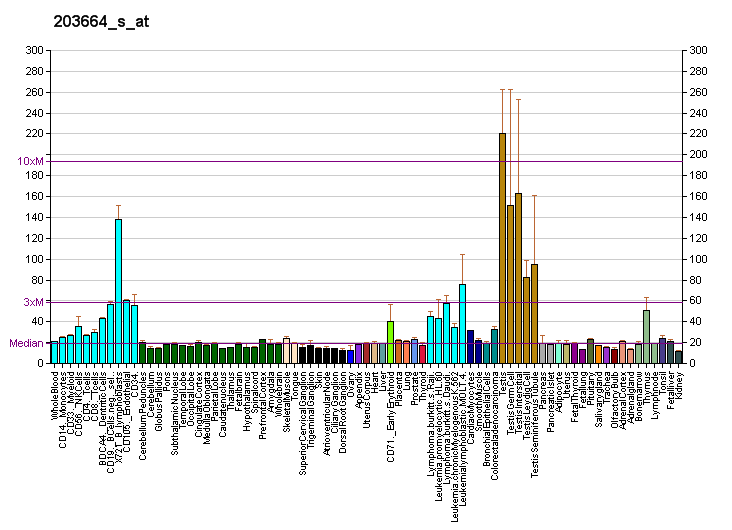

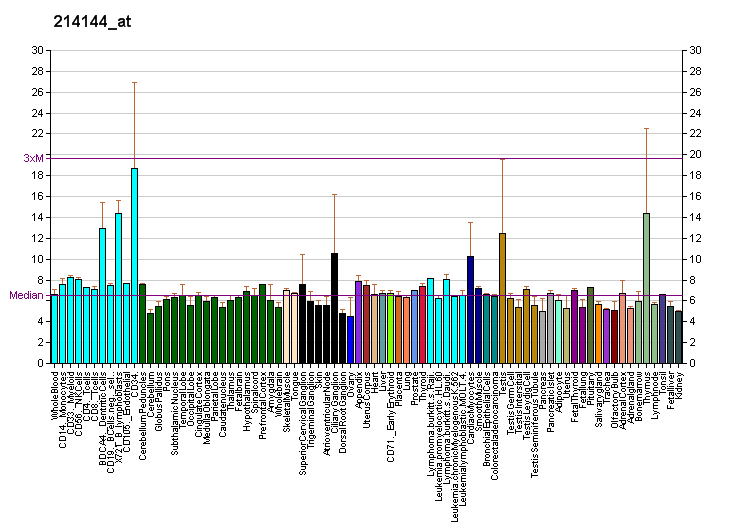
RNA expression pattern
Bgee	Human / Mouse (ortholog); Top expressed in: endothelial cell; left testis; right testis; pancreatic ductal cell; tibialis anterior muscle; ganglionic eminence; ventricular zone; islet of Langerhans; gastrocnemius muscle; quadriceps femoris muscle / Top expressed in: primary oocyte; yolk sac; ventricular zone; embryo; embryo; secondary oocyte; epiblast; endocardial cushion; medial ganglionic eminence; morula; More reference expression data
BioGPS	More reference expression data
Gene ontology
Molecular function	nucleotide binding; DNA-directed 5'-3' RNA polymerase activity; single-stranded DNA binding; catalytic activity; single-stranded RNA binding; translation initiation factor binding
Cellular component	P-body; RNA polymerase II, core complex; nucleus; nucleoplasm; cytosol; nuclear speck; nuclear DNA-directed RNA polymerase complex; RNA polymerase complex
Biological process	mRNA splicing, via spliceosome; recruitment of 3'-end processing factors to RNA polymerase II holoenzyme complex; transcription elongation from RNA polymerase II promoter; 7-methylguanosine mRNA capping; transcription by RNA polymerase II; nuclear-transcribed mRNA catabolic process, deadenylation-dependent decay; cell metabolism; transcription-coupled nucleotide-excision repair; transcription initiation from RNA polymerase II promoter; positive regulation of translational initiation; mRNA export from nucleus in response to heat stress; fibroblast growth factor receptor signaling pathway; snRNA transcription by RNA polymerase II; RNA metabolic process; regulation of gene silencing by miRNA; DNA-templated transcription, initiation; transcription, DNA-templated; somatic stem cell population maintenance; positive regulation of viral transcription
Sources:Amigo / QuickGO
Orthologs
Databases	NCBI: entry; OMA: entry
Species	Human	Mouse
Entrez	5433	69241
Ensembl	ENSG00000144231	ENSMUSG00000024258
UniProt	O15514	Q9D7M8
RefSeq (mRNA)	NM_004805	NM_027002; NM_001357480
RefSeq (protein)	NP_004796	NP_081278; NP_001344409
Location (UCSC)	Chr 2: 127.84 – 127.86 Mb	Chr 18: 31.92 – 31.93 Mb
PubMed search
- Wikidata
View/Edit Human	View/Edit Mouse

DNA-directed RNA polymerase II subunit RPB4 is an enzyme that in humans is encoded by the POLR2D gene.

This gene encodes the fourth-largest subunit of RNA polymerase II, the polymerase responsible for synthesizing messenger RNA in eukaryotes. In yeast, this polymerase subunit is associated with the polymerase under suboptimal growth conditions and may have a stress protective role. A sequence for a ribosomal pseudogene is contained within the 3' untranslated region of the transcript from this gene.
