= UBA5 =

Protein-coding gene in the species Homo sapiens

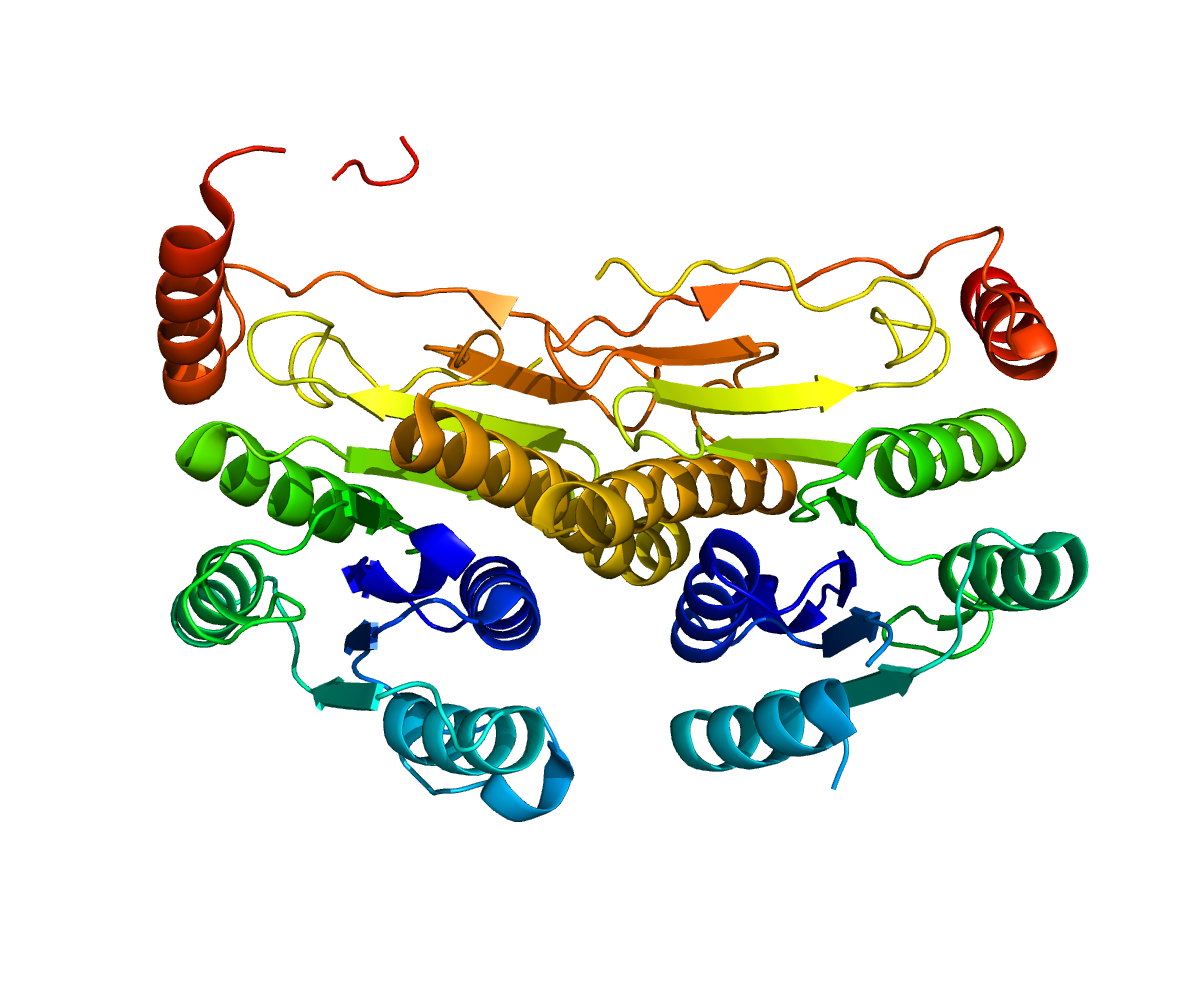

Identifiers
- Aliases: UBA5, THIFP1, UBE1DC1, ubiquitin like modifier activating enzyme 5, SCAR24, EIEE44, DEE44
- External IDs: OMIM: 610552; MGI: 1913913; GeneCards: UBA5
Available structures
PDB	Ortholog search: PDBe RCSB
PDB	List of PDB id codes 3GUC, 3H8V, 5HKH

Gene location (Human)
Chr.	Chromosome 3 (human)
Band	3q22.1	Start	132,654,446 bp
Band	3q22.1	End	132,679,794 bp

Gene location (Mouse)
Chr.	Chromosome 9 (mouse)
Band	9|9 F1	Start	103,923,798 bp
Band	9|9 F1	End	103,940,333 bp
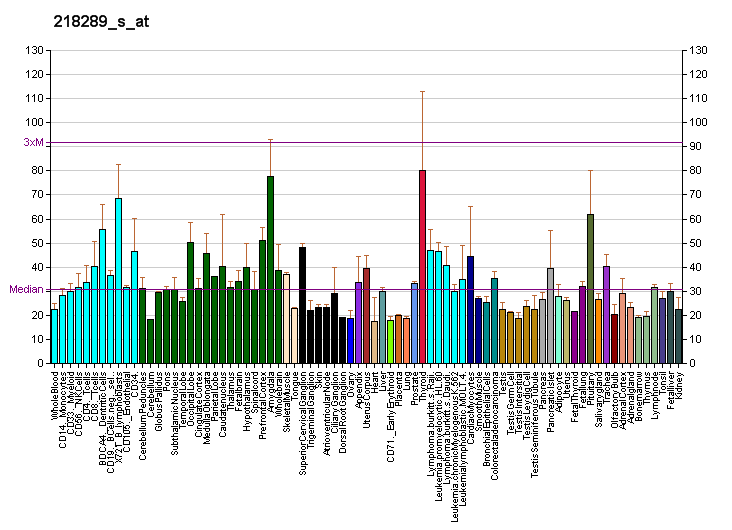
RNA expression pattern
Bgee	Human / Mouse (ortholog); Top expressed in: body of pancreas; right adrenal gland; right adrenal cortex; left adrenal gland; left adrenal cortex; parotid gland; anterior pituitary; Achilles tendon; minor salivary glands; secondary oocyte / Top expressed in: lacrimal gland; Ileal epithelium; parotid gland; seminal vesicula; fossa; islet of Langerhans; supraoptic nucleus; facial motor nucleus; substantia nigra; median eminence; More reference expression data
BioGPS	More reference expression data
Gene ontology
Molecular function	nucleotide binding; protein binding; ubiquitin-like modifier activating enzyme activity; ATP binding; metal ion binding; UFM1 activating enzyme activity
Cellular component	cytoplasm; intracellular membrane-bounded organelle; nucleus; cytosol; Golgi apparatus
Biological process	regulation of intracellular estrogen receptor signaling pathway; protein K69-linked ufmylation; response to endoplasmic reticulum stress; protein ufmylation; neuromuscular process; protein modification by small protein conjugation
Sources:Amigo / QuickGO
Orthologs
Databases	NCBI: entry; OMA: entry
Species	Human	Mouse
Entrez	79876	66663
Ensembl	ENSG00000081307	ENSMUSG00000032557
UniProt	Q9GZZ9	Q8VE47
RefSeq (mRNA)	NM_024818; NM_198329; NM_001320210; NM_001321238; NM_001321239	NM_025692
RefSeq (protein)	NP_001307139; NP_001308167; NP_001308168; NP_079094; NP_938143	NP_079968
Location (UCSC)	Chr 3: 132.65 – 132.68 Mb	Chr 9: 103.92 – 103.94 Mb
PubMed search
- Wikidata
View/Edit Human	View/Edit Mouse

Ubiquitin-like modifier-activating enzyme 5 is a protein that in humans is encoded by the UBA5 gene.

This gene encodes a member of the E1-like activating enzyme family. Two alternatively spliced transcript variants encoding distinct isoforms have been found for this gene.
