= Alanyl-tRNA synthetase domain containing 1 =

Protein in homo sapiens

AARSD1

Identifiers
- Aliases: AARSD1, alanyl-tRNA synthetase domain containing 1, AlaXp
- External IDs: OMIM: 613212; MGI: 1916934; HomoloGene: 6821; GeneCards: AARSD1; OMA:AARSD1 - orthologs

Gene location (Human)
Chr.	Chromosome 17 (human)
Band	17q21.31	Start	42,950,526 bp
Band	17q21.31	End	42,964,498 bp

Gene location (Mouse)
Chr.	Chromosome 11 (mouse)
Band	11|11 D	Start	101,297,665 bp
Band	11|11 D	End	101,308,441 bp
RNA expression pattern
Bgee	Human / Mouse (ortholog); Top expressed in: left testis; right testis; cerebellar hemisphere; Pituitary Gland; anterior pituitary; right ovary; right hemisphere of cerebellum; left ovary; body of pancreas; gastrocnemius muscle / Top expressed in: proximal tubule; neural tube; Mesencephalon; lens; epiblast; right kidney; ganglionic eminence; embryo; islet of Langerhans; tail of embryo; More reference expression data
BioGPS	n/a
Gene ontology
Molecular function	nucleotide binding; alanine-tRNA ligase activity; protein binding; ATP binding; metal ion binding; aminoacyl-tRNA editing activity; nucleic acid binding; Ser-tRNA(Ala) hydrolase activity; molecular function; aminoacyl-tRNA ligase activity
Cellular component	cytoplasm; nucleus
Biological process	alanyl-tRNA aminoacylation; tRNA aminoacylation; protein biosynthesis; regulation of translational fidelity; biological process; aminoacyl-tRNA metabolism involved in translational fidelity
Sources:Amigo / QuickGO
Orthologs
Species	Human	Mouse
Entrez	80755	69684
Ensembl	ENSG00000266967	ENSMUSG00000075528
UniProt	Q9BTE6	Q3THG9
RefSeq (mRNA)	NM_001261434	NM_144829
RefSeq (protein)	NP_001248363	NP_659078
Location (UCSC)	Chr 17: 42.95 – 42.96 Mb	Chr 11: 101.3 – 101.31 Mb
PubMed search
- Wikidata
View/Edit Human	View/Edit Mouse

Alanyl-tRNA synthetase domain containing 1 is a protein in humans encoded by the AARSD1 gene.
