= Sperm-associated antigen 7 =

Protein-coding gene in the species Homo sapiens

SPAG7
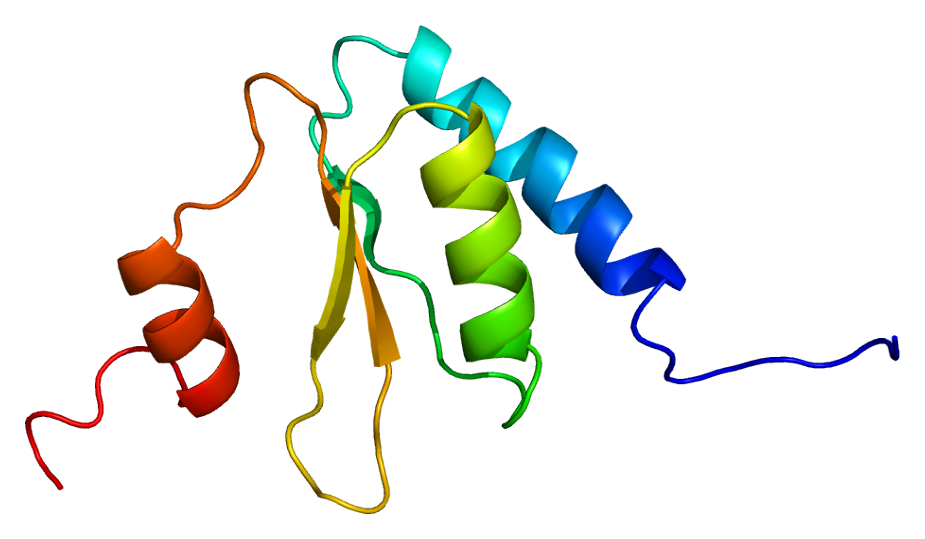
Available structures
PDB	Ortholog search: PDBe RCSB
PDB	List of PDB id codes 2CPM

Identifiers
- Aliases: SPAG7, ACRP, FSA-1, sperm associated antigen 7
- External IDs: OMIM: 610056; MGI: 107380; HomoloGene: 3595; GeneCards: SPAG7; OMA:SPAG7 - orthologs

Gene location (Human)
Chr.	Chromosome 17 (human)
Band	17p13.2	Start	4,959,226 bp
Band	17p13.2	End	4,967,817 bp

Gene location (Mouse)
Chr.	Chromosome 11 (mouse)
Band	11 B3|11 43.21 cM	Start	70,554,597 bp
Band	11 B3|11 43.21 cM	End	70,560,242 bp
RNA expression pattern
Bgee	Human / Mouse (ortholog); Top expressed in: apex of heart; muscle of thigh; gastrocnemius muscle; triceps brachii muscle; left ventricle; vastus lateralis muscle; right auricle of heart; deltoid muscle; thoracic diaphragm; body of tongue / Top expressed in: neural layer of retina; muscle of thigh; blastocyst; morula; choroid plexus of fourth ventricle; embryo; interventricular septum; embryo; ventricular zone; yolk sac; More reference expression data
BioGPS	n/a
Orthologs
Species	Human	Mouse
Entrez	9552	216873
Ensembl	ENSG00000091640	ENSMUSG00000018287
UniProt	O75391	Q7TNE3
RefSeq (mRNA)	NM_004890	NM_001167669; NM_172561
RefSeq (protein)	NP_004881	NP_001161141; NP_766149
Location (UCSC)	Chr 17: 4.96 – 4.97 Mb	Chr 11: 70.55 – 70.56 Mb
PubMed search
- Wikidata
View/Edit Human	View/Edit Mouse

Sperm-associated antigen 7 is a protein that in humans is encoded by the SPAG7 gene.
