= HSPA14 =

Protein-coding gene in the species Homo sapiens

Identifiers
- Aliases: HSPA14, HSP70-4, HSP70L1, heat shock protein family A (Hsp70) member 14
- External IDs: OMIM: 610369; MGI: 1354164; GeneCards: HSPA14

Gene location (Human)
Chr.	Chromosome 10 (human)
Band	10p13	Start	14,838,306 bp
Band	10p13	End	14,871,741 bp

Gene location (Mouse)
Chr.	Chromosome 2 (mouse)
Band	2|2 A1	Start	3,489,887 bp
Band	2|2 A1	End	3,513,851 bp
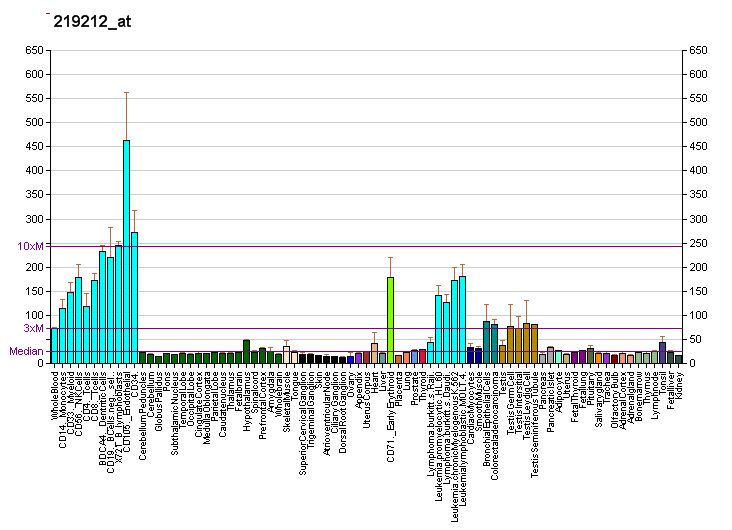
RNA expression pattern
Bgee	Human / Mouse (ortholog); Top expressed in: secondary oocyte; middle temporal gyrus; right testis; rectum; deltoid muscle; left testis; gastrocnemius muscle; mucosa of sigmoid colon; vastus lateralis muscle; Skeletal muscle tissue of biceps brachii / Top expressed in: primitive streak; epiblast; otic placode; abdominal wall; otic vesicle; yolk sac; dermis; morula; morula; embryo; More reference expression data
BioGPS	More reference expression data
Gene ontology
Molecular function	nucleotide binding; protein binding; ATP binding; ATPase activity; heat shock protein binding; protein folding chaperone activity; unfolded protein binding; misfolded protein binding
Cellular component	cytoplasm; cytosol; ribosome; membrane; polysome
Biological process	'de novo' cotranslational protein folding; cytoplasmic translation; regulation of translational fidelity; response to unfolded protein; cellular response to heat; Unfolded Protein Response; protein refolding; chaperone cofactor-dependent protein refolding
Sources:Amigo / QuickGO
Orthologs
Databases	NCBI: entry; OMA: entry
Species	Human	Mouse
Entrez	51182	50497
Ensembl	ENSG00000187522	ENSMUSG00000109865
UniProt	Q0VDF9; Q8TAQ0	Q99M31
RefSeq (mRNA)	NM_001037538; NM_001278205; NM_016299	NM_001037542; NM_015765; NM_001355397
RefSeq (protein)	NP_057383; NP_001265134.1	NP_056580; NP_001342326
Location (UCSC)	Chr 10: 14.84 – 14.87 Mb	Chr 2: 3.49 – 3.51 Mb
PubMed search
- Wikidata
View/Edit Human	View/Edit Mouse

Heat shock 70 kDa protein 14 also known as HSP70-like protein 1 or heat shock protein HSP60 is a protein that in humans is encoded by the HSPA14 gene.
