= GUK1 =

Protein-coding gene in humans

Identifiers
- Aliases: GUK1, GMK, guanylate kinase 1
- External IDs: OMIM: 139270; MGI: 95871; GeneCards: GUK1
Enzyme activity
EC #	BRENDA	ExPASy	KEGG	MetaCyc
2.7.4.8	↗	↗	↗	↗

Gene location (Human)
Chr.	Chromosome 1 (human)
Band	1q42.13	Start	228,139,962 bp
Band	1q42.13	End	228,148,984 bp

Gene location (Mouse)
Chr.	Chromosome 11 (mouse)
Band	11|11 B1.3	Start	59,074,701 bp
Band	11|11 B1.3	End	59,083,038 bp
RNA expression pattern
Bgee	Human / Mouse (ortholog); Top expressed in: right frontal lobe; prefrontal cortex; amygdala; C1 segment; skin of leg; skin of abdomen; nucleus accumbens; right lung; caudate nucleus; ascending aorta / Top expressed in: neural layer of retina; facial motor nucleus; dentate gyrus of hippocampal formation granule cell; right kidney; islet of Langerhans; epithelium of lens; esophagus; superior frontal gyrus; anterior horn of spinal cord; embryo; More reference expression data
BioGPS	n/a
Gene ontology
Molecular function	ATP binding; kinase activity; nucleotide binding; transferase activity; guanylate kinase activity
Cellular component	cytosol
Biological process	dGMP metabolic process; purine nucleotide metabolic process; nucleobase-containing small molecule interconversion; glycoprotein transport; GMP metabolic process; ATP metabolic process; nucleotide phosphorylation; GDP biosynthetic process; dGDP biosynthetic process; dATP metabolic process; phosphorylation; GDP-mannose metabolic process; GDP metabolic process
Sources:Amigo / QuickGO
Orthologs
Databases	NCBI: entry; OMA: entry
Species	Human	Mouse
Entrez	2987	14923
Ensembl	ENSG00000143774	ENSMUSG00000020444
UniProt	Q16774; Q6IBG8	Q64520
RefSeq (mRNA)	NM_000858; NM_001159390; NM_001159391; NM_001242839; NM_001242840	NM_001159410; NM_008193
RefSeq (protein)	NP_000849; NP_001152862; NP_001152863; NP_001229768; NP_001229769 NP_000849.1; NP_001152862.1; NP_001152863.1; NP_001229768.1	NP_001152882; NP_032219; NP_001390762; NP_001390763; NP_001390764 NP_001390765; NP_001390766
Location (UCSC)	Chr 1: 228.14 – 228.15 Mb	Chr 11: 59.07 – 59.08 Mb
PubMed search
- Wikidata
View/Edit Human	View/Edit Mouse

Guanylate kinase is an enzyme that in humans is encoded by the GUK1 gene.
