= RAB22A =

Protein-coding gene in the species Homo sapiens

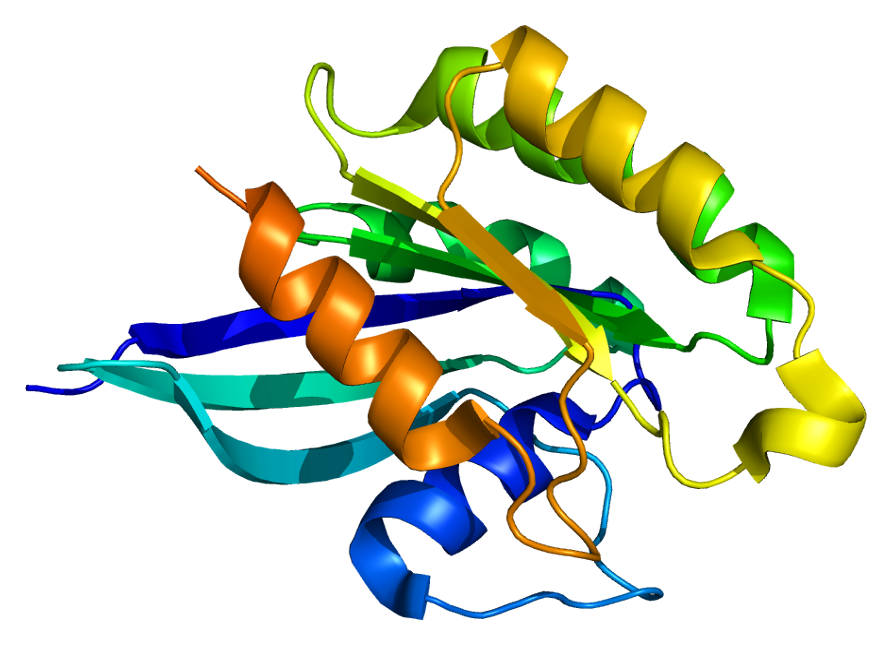

Identifiers
- Aliases: RAB22A, member RAS oncogene family
- External IDs: OMIM: 612966; MGI: 105072; GeneCards: RAB22A
Enzyme activity
EC #	BRENDA	ExPASy	KEGG	MetaCyc
3.6.5.2	↗	↗	↗	↗

Gene location (Human)
Chr.	Chromosome 20 (human)
Band	20q13.32	Start	58,309,715 bp
Band	20q13.32	End	58,367,507 bp

Gene location (Mouse)
Chr.	Chromosome 2 (mouse)
Band	2 H4|2 97.26 cM	Start	173,501,553 bp
Band	2 H4|2 97.26 cM	End	173,549,136 bp
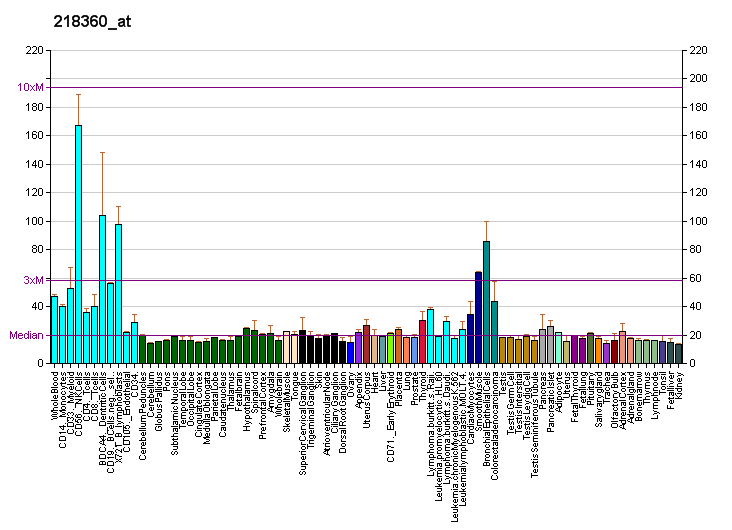

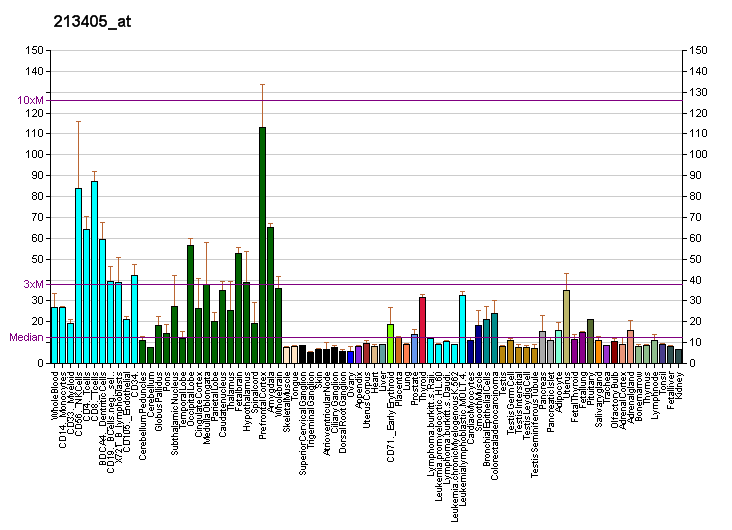
RNA expression pattern
Bgee	Human / Mouse (ortholog); Top expressed in: middle temporal gyrus; frontal pole; Brodmann area 10; Brodmann area 23; Brodmann area 46; middle frontal gyrus; oocyte; secondary oocyte; tendon of biceps brachii; orbitofrontal cortex / Top expressed in: interventricular septum; aortic valve; ascending aorta; cumulus cell; otic vesicle; right ventricle; internal carotid artery; temporal muscle; saccule; triceps brachii muscle; More reference expression data
BioGPS	More reference expression data
Gene ontology
Molecular function	nucleotide binding; GDP binding; GTP binding; protein binding; GTPase activity
Cellular component	endosome; late endosome; phagocytic vesicle membrane; cell projection; membrane; ruffle; plasma membrane; early endosome; phagocytic vesicle; actin cytoskeleton; endosome membrane; extracellular exosome; cytoplasmic vesicle
Biological process	endosome organization; regulation of vesicle size; protein transport; transport; endocytosis; intracellular protein transport; Rab protein signal transduction
Sources:Amigo / QuickGO
Orthologs
Databases	NCBI: entry; OMA: entry
Species	Human	Mouse
Entrez	57403	19334
Ensembl	ENSG00000124209	ENSMUSG00000027519
UniProt	Q9UL26	P35285
RefSeq (mRNA)	NM_020673	NM_024436
RefSeq (protein)	NP_065724	NP_077756
Location (UCSC)	Chr 20: 58.31 – 58.37 Mb	Chr 2: 173.5 – 173.55 Mb
PubMed search
- Wikidata
View/Edit Human	View/Edit Mouse

Ras-related protein Rab-22A is a protein that in humans is encoded by the RAB22A gene.

The protein encoded by this gene is a member of the RAB family of small GTPases. The GTP-bound form of the encoded protein has been shown to interact with early-endosomal antigen 1, and may be involved in the trafficking of and interaction between endosomal compartments.
