= H1FX =

Protein-coding gene in the species Homo sapiens

H1-10

Identifiers
- Aliases: H1-10, H1X, H1.10, H1 histone family member X, H1FX, H1.10 linker histone
- External IDs: OMIM: 602785; MGI: 2685307; GeneCards: H1-10
Available structures
| PDB | Ortholog search: PDBe RCSB |
| PDB | List of PDB id codes 2LSO |

Gene location (Human)
| Chr. | Chromosome 3 (human) |
| Band | 3q21.3 | Start | 129,314,771 bp |
| Band | 3q21.3 | End | 129,316,286 bp |

Gene location (Mouse)
| Chr. | Chromosome 6 (mouse) |
| Band | 6|6 D1 | Start | 87,957,403 bp |
| Band | 6|6 D1 | End | 87,958,619 bp |
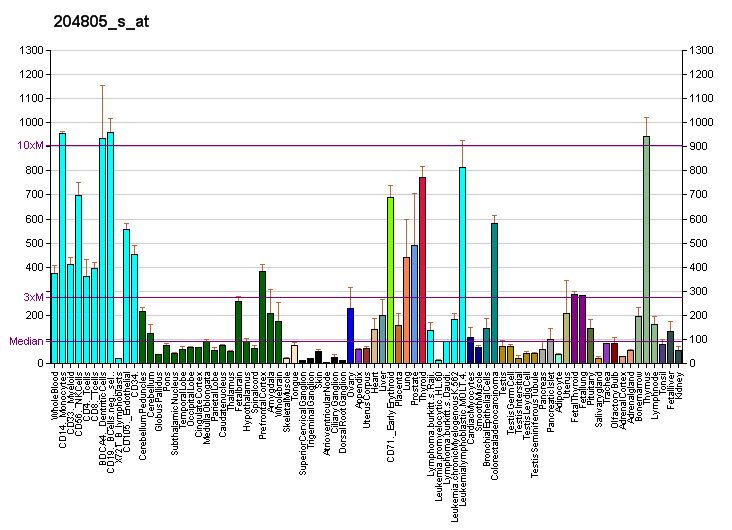
RNA expression pattern
| Bgee | Human / Mouse (ortholog); Top expressed in: ventricular zone; ganglionic eminence; olfactory zone of nasal mucosa; thymus; ectocervix; right ovary; skin of abdomen; right uterine tube; left ovary; left uterine tube / Top expressed in: ventricular zone; adrenal medulla; ganglionic eminence; white adipose tissue; striatum of neuraxis; lens; testicle; neural tube; primary visual cortex; superior frontal gyrus; More reference expression data |
| BioGPS | More reference expression data |
Gene ontology
| Molecular function | DNA binding; RNA binding; cadherin binding; double-stranded DNA binding; protein binding; nucleosomal DNA binding |
| Cellular component | nucleosome; nucleolus; nucleus; chromosome |
| Biological process | nucleosome assembly; regulation of transcription, DNA-templated; chromosome condensation; negative regulation of DNA recombination |
Sources:Amigo / QuickGO
Orthologs
| Databases | NCBI: entry; OMA: entry |
| Species | Human | Mouse |
| Entrez | 8971 | 243529 |
| Ensembl | ENSG00000184897 | ENSMUSG00000044927 |
| UniProt | Q92522 | Q80ZM5 |
| RefSeq (mRNA) | NM_006026 | NM_198622 |
| RefSeq (protein) | NP_006017 | NP_941024 |
| Location (UCSC) | Chr 3: 129.31 – 129.32 Mb | Chr 6: 87.96 – 87.96 Mb |
| PubMed search |
- Wikidata
| View/Edit Human | View/Edit Mouse |

Histone H1x is a protein that in humans is encoded by the H1FX gene.

Histones are basic nuclear proteins that are responsible for the nucleosome structure of the chromosomal fiber in eukaryotes. Nucleosomes consist of approximately 146 bp of DNA wrapped around a histone octamer composed of pairs of each of the four core histones (H2A, H2B, H3, and H4). The chromatin fiber is further compacted through the interaction of a linker histone, H1, with the DNA between the nucleosomes to form higher order chromatin structures. This gene encodes a member of the histone H1 family.
