= PFDN4 =

Protein-coding gene in the species Homo sapiens

Identifiers
- Aliases: PFDN4, C1, PFD4, prefoldin subunit 4
- External IDs: OMIM: 604898; MGI: 1923512; HomoloGene: 37645; GeneCards: PFDN4; OMA:PFDN4 - orthologs

Gene location (Human)
Chr.	Chromosome 20 (human)
Band	20q13.2	Start	54,208,087 bp
Band	20q13.2	End	54,228,052 bp

Gene location (Mouse)
Chr.	Chromosome 2 (mouse)
Band	2 H3|2 91.91 cM	Start	170,338,348 bp
Band	2 H3|2 91.91 cM	End	170,361,043 bp
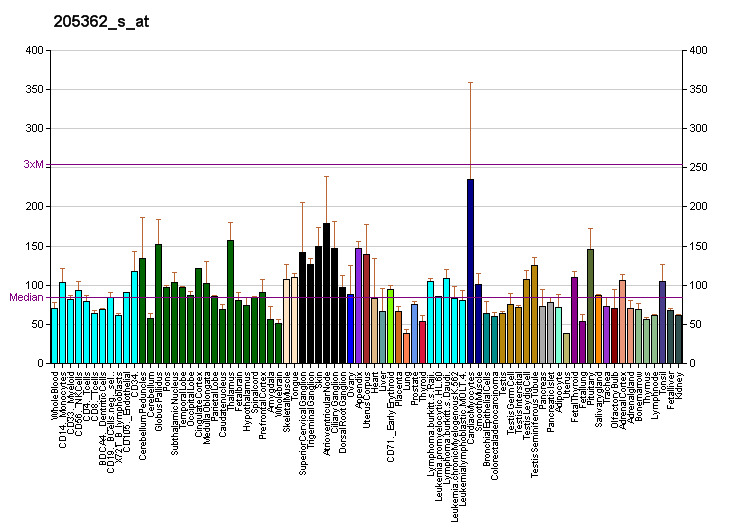

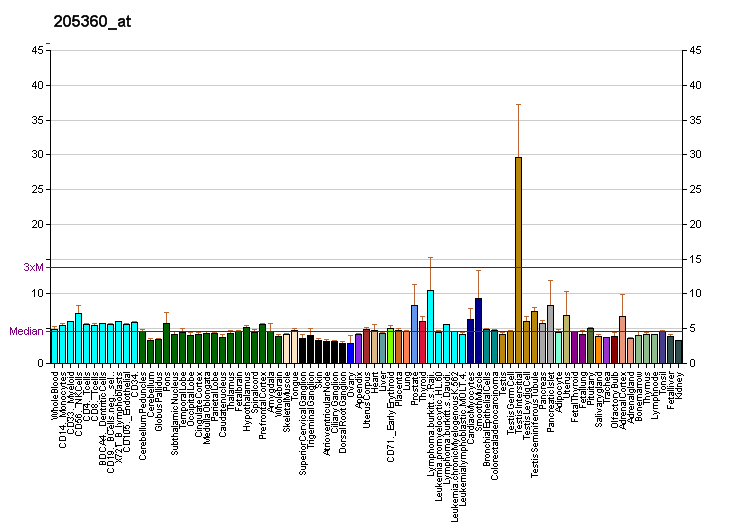

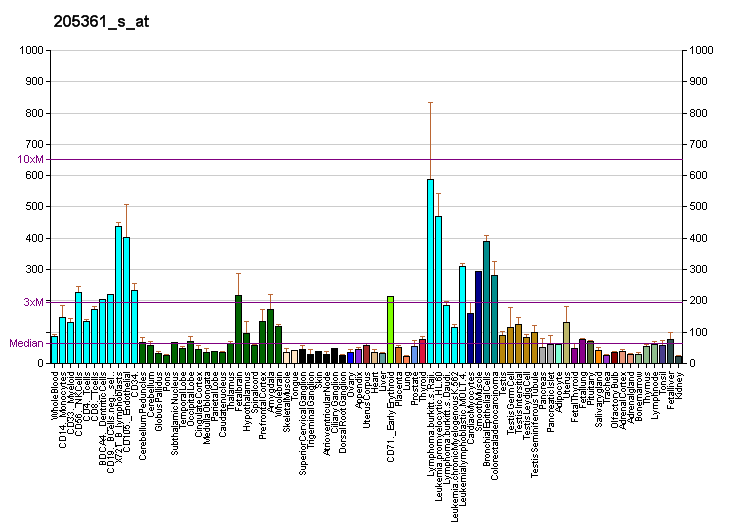
RNA expression pattern
Bgee	Human / Mouse (ortholog); Top expressed in: oocyte; ganglionic eminence; Achilles tendon; frontal pole; Brodmann area 10; paraflocculus of cerebellum; superficial temporal artery; ventricular zone; palpebral conjunctiva; secondary oocyte / Top expressed in: zygote; primary oocyte; secondary oocyte; medial ganglionic eminence; hand; epiblast; facial motor nucleus; ventricular zone; embryo; superior cervical ganglion; More reference expression data
BioGPS	More reference expression data
Gene ontology
Molecular function	chaperone binding; unfolded protein binding; protein binding
Cellular component	cytosol; nucleus; cytoplasm; prefoldin complex; mitochondrion
Biological process	protein folding
Sources:Amigo / QuickGO
Orthologs
Species	Human	Mouse
Entrez	5203	109054
Ensembl	ENSG00000101132	ENSMUSG00000052033
UniProt	Q9NQP4	n/a
RefSeq (mRNA)	NM_002623	NM_001013369; NM_001110152; NM_001199902
RefSeq (protein)	NP_002614	n/a
Location (UCSC)	Chr 20: 54.21 – 54.23 Mb	Chr 2: 170.34 – 170.36 Mb
PubMed search
- Wikidata
View/Edit Human	View/Edit Mouse

Prefoldin subunit 4 is a protein that in humans is encoded by the PFDN4 gene.

== Function ==
This gene encodes a member of the prefoldin beta subunit family. The encoded protein is one of six subunits of prefoldin, a molecular chaperone complex that binds and stabilizes newly synthesized polypeptides, thereby allowing them to fold correctly. The complex, consisting of two alpha and four beta subunits, forms a double beta barrel assembly with six protruding coiled-coils.
