= AP2S1 =

Protein-coding gene in the species Homo sapiens

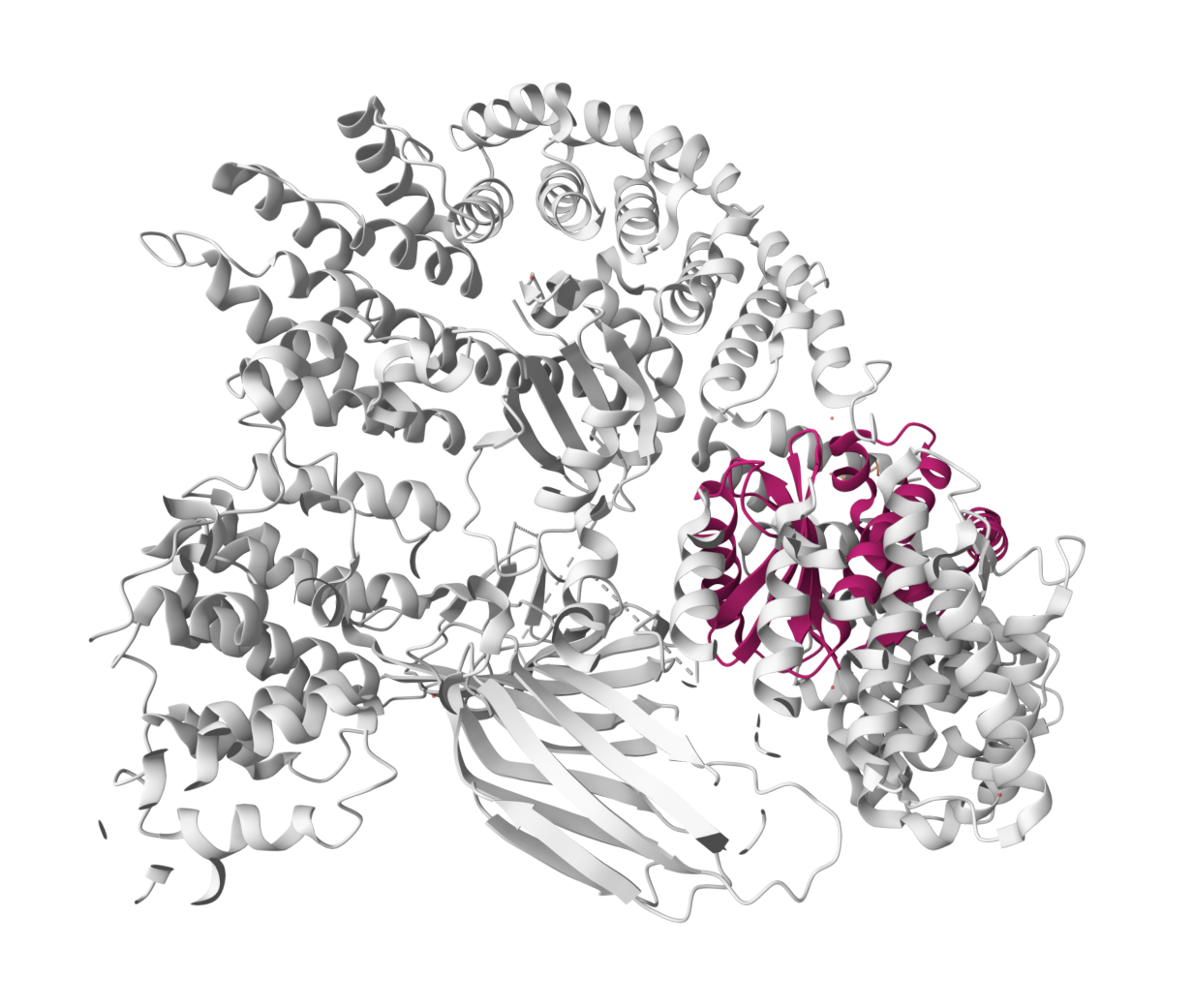

Identifiers
- Aliases: AP2S1, AP17, CLAPS2, FBH3, FBHOk, HHC3, adaptor related protein complex 2 sigma 1 subunit, adaptor related protein complex 2 subunit sigma 1
- External IDs: OMIM: 602242; MGI: 2141861; GeneCards: AP2S1
Available structures
PDB	Ortholog search: PDBe RCSB
PDB	List of PDB id codes 2JKR, 2JKT, 2VGL, 2XA7, 4UQI, 4NEE

Gene location (Human)
Chr.	Chromosome 19 (human)
Band	19q13.32	Start	46,838,136 bp
Band	19q13.32	End	46,850,846 bp

Gene location (Mouse)
Chr.	Chromosome 7 (mouse)
Band	7|7 A2	Start	16,472,335 bp
Band	7|7 A2	End	16,483,219 bp
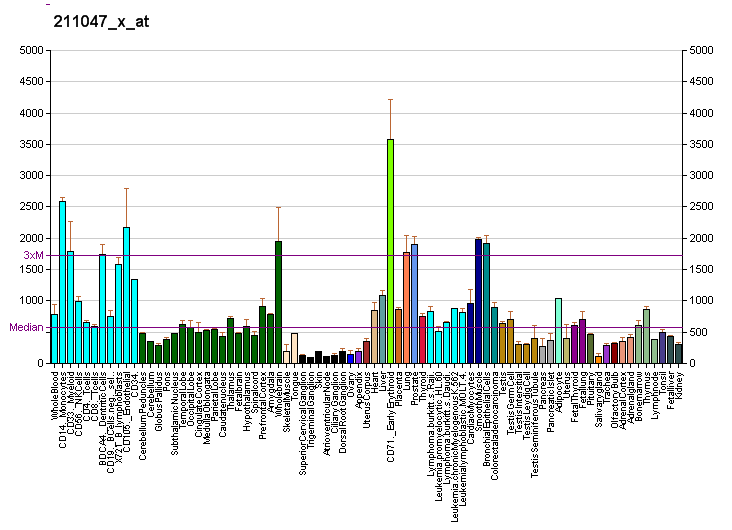

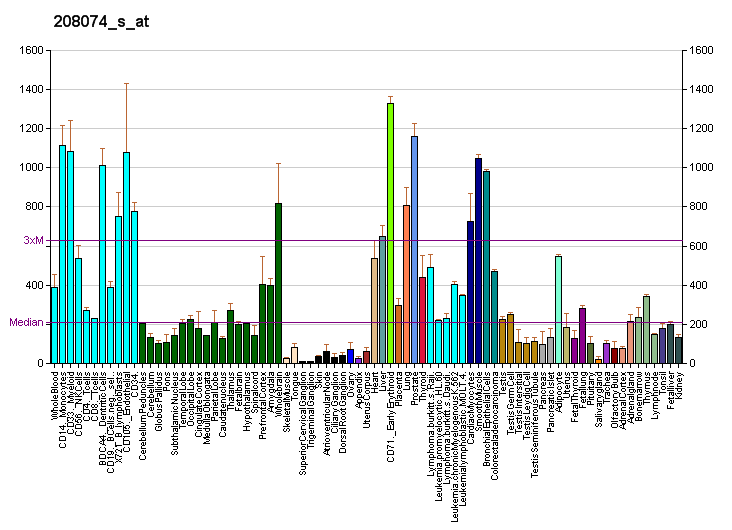

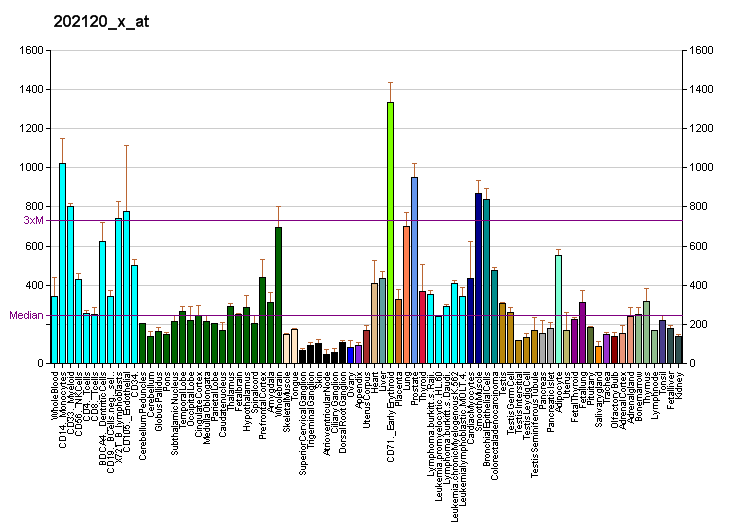
RNA expression pattern
Bgee	Human / Mouse (ortholog); Top expressed in: stromal cell of endometrium; right adrenal gland; right frontal lobe; mucosa of transverse colon; human penis; right adrenal cortex; left adrenal gland; left adrenal cortex; prefrontal cortex; cingulate gyrus / Top expressed in: dentate gyrus of hippocampal formation granule cell; primary visual cortex; superior frontal gyrus; granulocyte; facial motor nucleus; neural tube; ventricular zone; yolk sac; lip; stroma of bone marrow; More reference expression data
BioGPS	More reference expression data
Gene ontology
Molecular function	transporter activity; clathrin adaptor activity; protein binding
Cellular component	endocytic vesicle membrane; cytosol; clathrin-coated endocytic vesicle membrane; membrane; plasma membrane; endolysosome membrane; membrane coat; clathrin-coated pit; AP-2 adaptor complex; clathrin-coated endocytic vesicle; intracellular membrane-bounded organelle
Biological process	regulation of endocytosis; endocytosis; antigen processing and presentation of exogenous peptide antigen via MHC class II; ephrin receptor signaling pathway; mitigation of host defenses by virus; clathrin-dependent endocytosis; clathrin coat assembly; protein transport; intracellular protein transport; vesicle-mediated transport; microtubule-based movement; Wnt signaling pathway, planar cell polarity pathway; membrane organization; low-density lipoprotein particle receptor catabolic process; low-density lipoprotein particle clearance; transport
Sources:Amigo / QuickGO
Orthologs
Databases	NCBI: entry; OMA: entry
Species	Human	Mouse
Entrez	1175	232910
Ensembl	ENSG00000042753	ENSMUSG00000008036
UniProt	P53680	P62743
RefSeq (mRNA)	NM_001301076; NM_001301078; NM_001301081; NM_004069; NM_021575	NM_198613
RefSeq (protein)	NP_001288005; NP_001288007; NP_001288010; NP_004060; NP_067586	NP_941015
Location (UCSC)	Chr 19: 46.84 – 46.85 Mb	Chr 7: 16.47 – 16.48 Mb
PubMed search
- Wikidata
View/Edit Human	View/Edit Mouse

AP-2 complex subunit sigma is a protein that in humans is encoded by the AP2S1 gene.

One of two major clathrin-associated adaptor complexes, AP-2, is a heterotetramer which is associated with the plasma membrane. This complex is composed of two large chains, a medium chain, and a small chain. This gene encodes the small chain of this complex. Alternative splicing has been observed in this gene and results in two known transcripts.
