= SLC41A3 =

Protein-coding gene in the species Homo sapiens

Identifiers
- Aliases: SLC41A3, SLC41A1-L2, solute carrier family 41 member 3
- External IDs: OMIM: 610803; MGI: 1918949; GeneCards: SLC41A3

Gene location (Human)
| Chr. | Chromosome 3 (human) |
| Band | 3q21.2-q21.3 | Start | 126,006,357 bp |
| Band | 3q21.2-q21.3 | End | 126,101,561 bp |

Gene location (Mouse)
| Chr. | Chromosome 6 (mouse) |
| Band | 6|6 D1 | Start | 90,581,707 bp |
| Band | 6|6 D1 | End | 90,623,394 bp |
RNA expression pattern
| Bgee | Human / Mouse (ortholog); Top expressed in: right hemisphere of cerebellum; Descending thoracic aorta; left ovary; anterior cingulate cortex; prefrontal cortex; right frontal lobe; right ovary; ascending aorta; right testis; muscle of thigh / Top expressed in: interventricular septum; right ventricle; triceps brachii muscle; sternocleidomastoid muscle; digastric muscle; extraocular muscle; temporal muscle; quadriceps femoris muscle; vastus lateralis muscle; tibialis anterior muscle; More reference expression data |
| BioGPS | n/a |
Gene ontology
| Molecular function | cation transmembrane transporter activity; protein binding |
| Cellular component | integral component of membrane; membrane; plasma membrane |
| Biological process | cation transport; cation transmembrane transport; transmembrane transport |
Sources:Amigo / QuickGO
Orthologs
| Databases | NCBI: entry; OMA: entry |
| Species | Human | Mouse |
| Entrez | 54946 | 71699 |
| Ensembl | ENSG00000114544 | ENSMUSG00000030089 |
| UniProt | Q96GZ6 | Q921R8 |
| RefSeq (mRNA) | NM_001008485; NM_001008486; NM_001008487; NM_001164475; NM_017836 | NM_001037493; NM_027868 |
| RefSeq (protein) | NP_001008485; NP_001008486; NP_001008487; NP_001157947; NP_060306 NP_001008486.1 | NP_001032570; NP_082144 |
| Location (UCSC) | Chr 3: 126.01 – 126.1 Mb | Chr 6: 90.58 – 90.62 Mb |
| PubMed search |
- Wikidata
| View/Edit Human | View/Edit Mouse |

Solute carrier family 41, member 3 is a protein that in humans is encoded by the SLC41A3 gene.
