= SLC25A39 =

Protein-coding gene in the species Homo sapiens

Identifiers
- Aliases: SLC25A39, CGI69, CGI-69, solute carrier family 25 member 39
- External IDs: OMIM: 610820; MGI: 1196386; GeneCards: SLC25A39

Gene location (Human)
Chr.	Chromosome 17 (human)
Band	17q21.31	Start	44,319,625 bp
Band	17q21.31	End	44,324,870 bp

Gene location (Mouse)
Chr.	Chromosome 11 (mouse)
Band	11 D|11 66.29 cM	Start	102,293,811 bp
Band	11 D|11 66.29 cM	End	102,298,772 bp
RNA expression pattern
Bgee	Human / Mouse (ortholog); Top expressed in: blood; mucosa of transverse colon; right lobe of thyroid gland; anterior pituitary; right testis; right adrenal gland; left lobe of thyroid gland; right adrenal cortex; body of pancreas; left adrenal cortex / Top expressed in: right kidney; yolk sac; embryo; spermatocyte; spermatid; lip; embryo; ventricular zone; dentate gyrus of hippocampal formation granule cell; muscle of thigh; More reference expression data
BioGPS	n/a
Gene ontology
Molecular function	transmembrane transporter activity
Cellular component	membrane; mitochondrion; mitochondrial inner membrane; integral component of membrane
Biological process	heme biosynthetic process; mitochondrial transport; transmembrane transport
Sources:Amigo / QuickGO
Orthologs
Databases	NCBI: entry; OMA: entry
Species	Human	Mouse
Entrez	51629	68066
Ensembl	ENSG00000013306	ENSMUSG00000018677
UniProt	Q9BZJ4	Q9D8K8
RefSeq (mRNA)	NM_001143780; NM_016016; NM_001321240; NM_001321241; NM_001366726	NM_026542
RefSeq (protein)	NP_001137252; NP_001308169; NP_001308170; NP_057100; NP_001353655	NP_080818
Location (UCSC)	Chr 17: 44.32 – 44.32 Mb	Chr 11: 102.29 – 102.3 Mb
PubMed search
- Wikidata
View/Edit Human	View/Edit Mouse

Solute carrier family 25 member 39 is a protein that in humans is encoded by the SLC25A39 gene. The protein has been shown to be necessary for the import of the major antioxidant glutathione into the mitochondria.

== See also ==
- SLC25A39+protein,+human at the U.S. National Library of Medicine Medical Subject Headings (MeSH)
