= SLC48A1 =

Protein encoding gene in humans

Identifiers
- Aliases: SLC48A1, HRG-1, HRG1, hHRG-1, solute carrier family 48 member 1
- External IDs: OMIM: 612187; MGI: 1914989; GeneCards: SLC48A1

Gene location (Human)
| Chr. | Chromosome 12 (human) |
| Band | 12q13.11 | Start | 47,753,916 bp |
| Band | 12q13.11 | End | 47,782,751 bp |

Gene location (Mouse)
| Chr. | Chromosome 15 (mouse) |
| Band | 15 F1|15 | Start | 97,676,401 bp |
| Band | 15 F1|15 | End | 97,690,573 bp |
RNA expression pattern
| Bgee | Human / Mouse (ortholog); Top expressed in: C1 segment; inferior ganglion of vagus nerve; putamen; substantia nigra; subthalamic nucleus; amygdala; caudate nucleus; right frontal lobe; right lobe of thyroid gland; ventral tegmental area / Top expressed in: blood; right kidney; stroma of bone marrow; superior frontal gyrus; retinal pigment epithelium; proximal tubule; calvaria; lip; dentate gyrus of hippocampal formation granule cell; tibiofemoral joint; More reference expression data |
| BioGPS | n/a |
Gene ontology
| Molecular function | heme transmembrane transporter activity; heme binding; protein binding |
| Cellular component | integral component of membrane; endosome; lysosome; membrane; lysosomal membrane; plasma membrane; endosome membrane |
| Biological process | heme transport |
Sources:Amigo / QuickGO
Orthologs
| Databases | NCBI: entry; OMA: entry |
| Species | Human | Mouse |
| Entrez | 55652 | 67739 |
| Ensembl | ENSG00000211584 | ENSMUSG00000081534 |
| UniProt | Q6P1K1 | Q9D8M3 |
| RefSeq (mRNA) | NM_017842 | NM_026353 |
| RefSeq (protein) | NP_060312 | NP_080629 |
| Location (UCSC) | Chr 12: 47.75 – 47.78 Mb | Chr 15: 97.68 – 97.69 Mb |
| PubMed search |
- Wikidata
| View/Edit Human | View/Edit Mouse |

SLC48A1 is a protein that in humans is encoded by the SLC48A1 gene. SLC48A1 encodes the protein known as heme transporter HRG1, which acts as a solute carrier for transmembrane transport of heme.

SLC48A1 belongs to solute carrier family 48, and the HRG family, where it is found along with other membrane transporters involved in heme handling.
