= Immediate early response 2 =

Protein-coding gene in the species Homo sapiens

IER2

Identifiers
- Aliases: IER2, ETR101, immediate early response 2
- External IDs: MGI: 104815; HomoloGene: 3607; GeneCards: IER2; OMA:IER2 - orthologs

Gene location (Human)
Chr.	Chromosome 19 (human)
Band	19p13.13	Start	13,150,411 bp
Band	19p13.13	End	13,154,911 bp

Gene location (Mouse)
Chr.	Chromosome 8 (mouse)
Band	8 C3|8 41.02 cM	Start	85,387,960 bp
Band	8 C3|8 41.02 cM	End	85,389,483 bp
RNA expression pattern
Bgee	Human / Mouse (ortholog); Top expressed in: nipple; skin of thigh; trachea; gastric mucosa; human penis; renal medulla; saphenous vein; granulocyte; cardia; vena cava / Top expressed in: granulocyte; islet of Langerhans; Ileal epithelium; lacrimal gland; hair follicle; crypt of lieberkuhn of small intestine; lip; bone marrow; right lung; corneal stroma; More reference expression data
BioGPS	n/a
Gene ontology
Molecular function	DNA binding; RNA polymerase II transcription regulatory region sequence-specific DNA binding; DNA-binding transcription activator activity, RNA polymerase II-specific
Cellular component	nucleoplasm; cytoplasm; nucleus
Biological process	neuron differentiation; cell motility; response to fibroblast growth factor; transcription by RNA polymerase II; positive regulation of transcription by RNA polymerase II
Sources:Amigo / QuickGO
Orthologs
Species	Human	Mouse
Entrez	9592	15936
Ensembl	ENSG00000160888	ENSMUSG00000053560
UniProt	Q9BTL4	P17950
RefSeq (mRNA)	NM_004907	NM_010499
RefSeq (protein)	NP_004898; NP_004898.2	NP_034629
Location (UCSC)	Chr 19: 13.15 – 13.15 Mb	Chr 8: 85.39 – 85.39 Mb
PubMed search
- Wikidata
View/Edit Human	View/Edit Mouse

Immediate early response 2 is a protein that in humans is encoded by the IER2 gene.
