= Annexin A6 =

Protein-coding gene in the species Homo sapiens

ANXA6
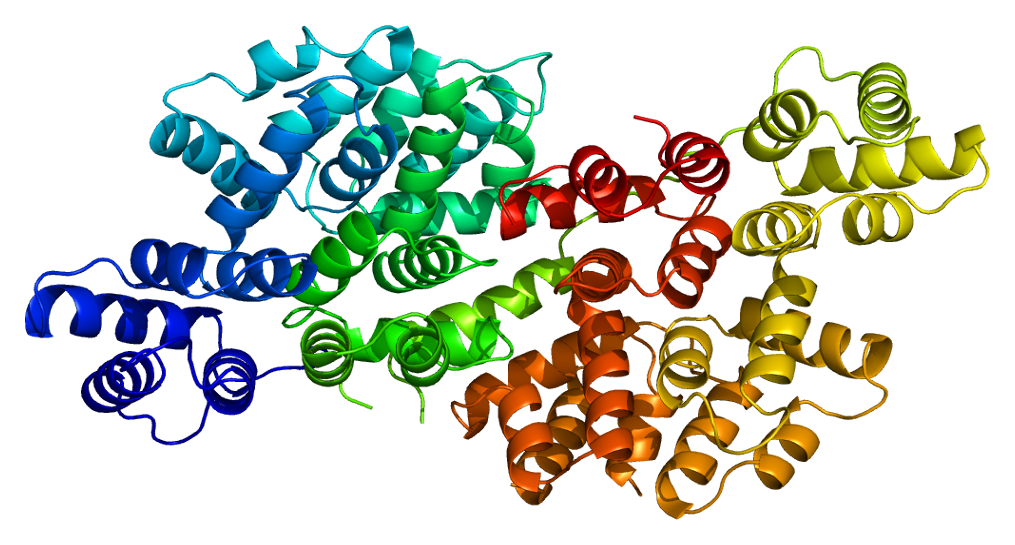

Identifiers
- Aliases: ANXA6, ANX6, CBP68, annexin A6, CPB-II, p70, p68
- External IDs: OMIM: 114070; MGI: 88255; GeneCards: ANXA6
Available structures
PDB	Ortholog search: PDBe RCSB
PDB	List of PDB id codes 1M9I

Gene location (Human)
Chr.	Chromosome 5 (human)
Band	5q33.1	Start	151,100,706 bp
Band	5q33.1	End	151,157,785 bp

Gene location (Mouse)
Chr.	Chromosome 11 (mouse)
Band	11 B1.3|11 32.13 cM	Start	54,869,934 bp
Band	11 B1.3|11 32.13 cM	End	54,924,271 bp
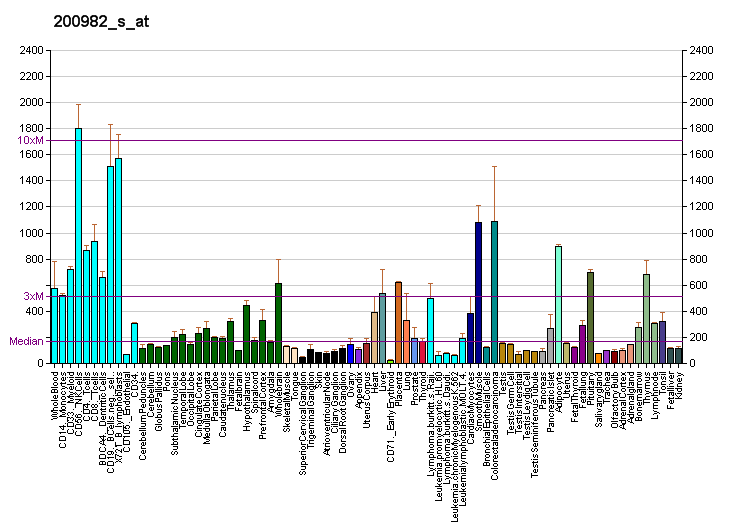
RNA expression pattern
Bgee	Human / Mouse (ortholog); Top expressed in: granulocyte; smooth muscle tissue; right coronary artery; apex of heart; stromal cell of endometrium; popliteal artery; muscle of thigh; tibial arteries; right ovary; gastric mucosa / Top expressed in: internal carotid artery; external carotid artery; lactiferous gland; yolk sac; subcutaneous adipose tissue; muscle of thigh; facial motor nucleus; dermis; vestibular sensory epithelium; stroma of bone marrow; More reference expression data
BioGPS	More reference expression data
Gene ontology
Molecular function	calcium ion binding; protein homodimerization activity; GTP binding; calcium-dependent protein binding; cholesterol binding; protein binding; ligand-gated ion channel activity; calcium-dependent phospholipid binding; lipid binding; phosphatidylserine binding; calcium channel activity; heparin binding; enzyme binding; chondroitin sulfate binding; signaling receptor activity; protein-containing complex binding; actin filament binding
Cellular component	cytoplasm; membrane; late endosome membrane; focal adhesion; melanosome; lysosomal membrane; mitochondrion; perinuclear region of cytoplasm; extracellular exosome; collagen-containing extracellular matrix
Biological process	regulation of muscle contraction; mitochondrial calcium ion homeostasis; ion transmembrane transport; apoptotic signaling pathway; protein homooligomerization; calcium ion transport; neural crest cell migration; plasma membrane repair; growth plate cartilage chondrocyte differentiation; biomineral tissue development; negative regulation of sequestering of calcium ion; calcium ion import; calcium ion transmembrane transport
Sources:Amigo / QuickGO
Orthologs
Databases	NCBI: entry; OMA: entry
Species	Human	Mouse
Entrez	309	11749
Ensembl	ENSG00000197043	ENSMUSG00000018340
UniProt	P08133	P14824
RefSeq (mRNA)	NM_001155; NM_001193544; NM_004033; NM_001363114	NM_001110211; NM_013472
RefSeq (protein)	NP_001146; NP_001180473; NP_001350043	NP_001103681; NP_038500
Location (UCSC)	Chr 5: 151.1 – 151.16 Mb	Chr 11: 54.87 – 54.92 Mb
PubMed search
- Wikidata
View/Edit Human	View/Edit Mouse

Annexin A6 is a protein that in humans is encoded by the ANXA6 gene.

== Function ==
Annexin VI belongs to a family of calcium-dependent membrane and phospholipid binding proteins. Although their functions are still not clearly defined, several members of the annexin family have been implicated in membrane-related events along exocytotic and endocytotic pathways. The annexin VI gene is approximately 60 kbp long and contains 26 exons. It encodes a protein of about 68 kDa that consists of eight 68-amino acid repeats separated by linking sequences of variable lengths. It is highly similar to human annexins I and II sequences, each of which contain four such repeats. Exon 21 of annexin VI is alternatively spliced, giving rise to two isoforms that differ by a 6-amino acid insertion at the start of the seventh repeat. Annexin VI has been implicated in mediating the endosome aggregation and vesicle fusion in secreting epithelia during exocytosis.

== Interactions ==
ANXA6 has been shown to interact with RAS p21 protein activator 1.
