= EIF1B =

Protein-coding gene in the species Homo sapiens

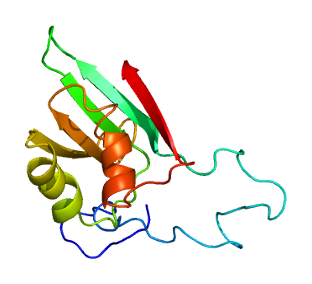

Identifiers
- Aliases: EIF1B, GC20, eukaryotic translation initiation factor 1B
- External IDs: MGI: 1916219; HomoloGene: 22219; GeneCards: EIF1B; OMA:EIF1B - orthologs

Gene location (Human)
Chr.	Chromosome 3 (human)
Band	3p22.1	Start	40,309,707 bp
Band	3p22.1	End	40,312,424 bp

Gene location (Mouse)
Chr.	Chromosome 9 (mouse)
Band	9|9 F4	Start	120,321,298 bp
Band	9|9 F4	End	120,324,396 bp
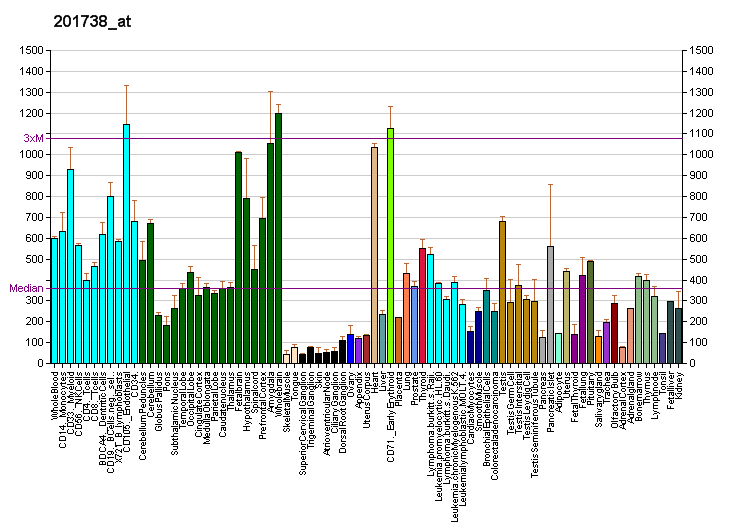
RNA expression pattern
Bgee	Human / Mouse (ortholog); Top expressed in: right ventricle; left ventricle; pons; myocardium; myocardium of left ventricle; right auricle of heart; endothelial cell; pars compacta; apex of heart; lateral nuclear group of thalamus / Top expressed in: ventricular zone; spermatocyte; facial motor nucleus; medial ganglionic eminence; anterior horn of spinal cord; neural tube; primary oocyte; seminiferous tubule; CA3 field; motor neuron; More reference expression data
BioGPS	More reference expression data
Gene ontology
Molecular function	translation initiation factor activity; RNA binding; ribosomal small subunit binding
Cellular component	cellular component; eukaryotic 43S preinitiation complex
Biological process	translational initiation; protein biosynthesis; regulation of translational initiation
Sources:Amigo / QuickGO
Orthologs
Species	Human	Mouse
Entrez	10289	68969
Ensembl	ENSG00000114784	ENSMUSG00000006941
UniProt	O60739	Q9CXU9
RefSeq (mRNA)	NM_005875	NM_026892
RefSeq (protein)	NP_005866	NP_081168
Location (UCSC)	Chr 3: 40.31 – 40.31 Mb	Chr 9: 120.32 – 120.32 Mb
PubMed search
- Wikidata
View/Edit Human	View/Edit Mouse

Eukaryotic translation initiation factor 1b is a protein that in humans is encoded by the EIF1B gene.
