= PFDN5 =

Protein-coding gene in the species Homo sapiens

Identifiers
- Aliases: PFDN5, MM-1, MM1, PFD5, prefoldin subunit 5
- External IDs: OMIM: 604899; MGI: 1928753; HomoloGene: 1972; GeneCards: PFDN5; OMA:PFDN5 - orthologs

Gene location (Human)
Chr.	Chromosome 12 (human)
Band	12q13.13	Start	53,295,291 bp
Band	12q13.13	End	53,299,452 bp

Gene location (Mouse)
Chr.	Chromosome 15 (mouse)
Band	15 F2|15 57.48 cM	Start	102,234,551 bp
Band	15 F2|15 57.48 cM	End	102,240,308 bp
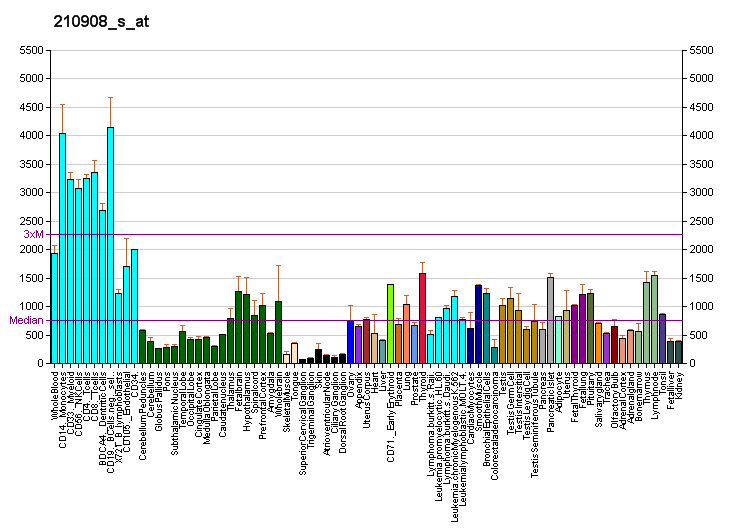

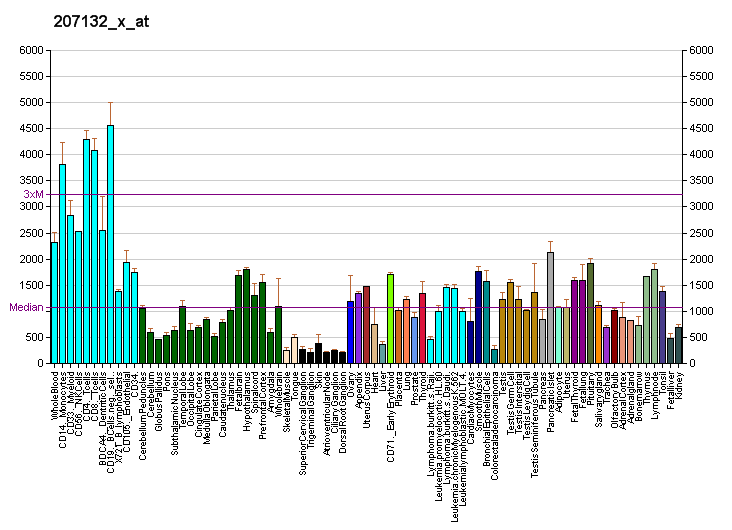
RNA expression pattern
Bgee	Human / Mouse (ortholog); Top expressed in: pituitary gland; anterior pituitary; granulocyte; left testis; right testis; canal of the cervix; hypothalamus; nucleus accumbens; amygdala; substantia nigra / Top expressed in: arcuate nucleus; endocardial cushion; mesenteric lymph nodes; transitional epithelium of urinary bladder; mammillary body; paraventricular nucleus of hypothalamus; globus pallidus; lateral septal nucleus; medial ganglionic eminence; lateral hypothalamus; More reference expression data
BioGPS	More reference expression data
Gene ontology
Molecular function	unfolded protein binding; protein binding; transcription corepressor activity
Cellular component	cytoplasm; nucleus; prefoldin complex
Biological process	negative regulation of transcription, DNA-templated; regulation of transcription, DNA-templated; retina development in camera-type eye; negative regulation of canonical Wnt signaling pathway; protein folding
Sources:Amigo / QuickGO
Orthologs
Species	Human	Mouse
Entrez	5204	56612
Ensembl	ENSG00000123349	ENSMUSG00000001289
UniProt	Q99471	Q9WU28
RefSeq (mRNA)	NM_145897; NM_002624; NM_145896	NM_020031; NM_027044
RefSeq (protein)	NP_002615; NP_665904	NP_081320
Location (UCSC)	Chr 12: 53.3 – 53.3 Mb	Chr 15: 102.23 – 102.24 Mb
PubMed search
- Wikidata
View/Edit Human	View/Edit Mouse

Prefoldin subunit 5 is a protein that in humans is encoded by the PFDN5 gene.

This gene encodes a member of the prefoldin alpha subunit family. The encoded protein is one of six subunits of prefoldin, a molecular chaperone complex that binds and stabilizes newly synthesized polypeptides, thereby allowing them to fold correctly. The complex, consisting of two alpha and four beta subunits, forms a double beta barrel assembly with six protruding coiled-coils. The encoded protein may also repress the transcriptional activity of the proto-oncogene c-Myc. Alternatively spliced transcript variants encoding different isoforms have been described.

== Interactions ==
PFDN5 has been shown to interact with Myc.
