= PFDN2 =

Protein-coding gene in humans

Identifiers
- Aliases: PFDN2, PFD2, prefoldin subunit 2
- External IDs: OMIM: 613466; MGI: 1276111; GeneCards: PFDN2

Gene location (Human)
Chr.	Chromosome 1 (human)
Band	1q23.3	Start	161,100,556 bp
Band	1q23.3	End	161,118,055 bp

Gene location (Mouse)
Chr.	Chromosome 1 (mouse)
Band	1 H3|1 79.35 cM	Start	171,173,238 bp
Band	1 H3|1 79.35 cM	End	171,186,822 bp
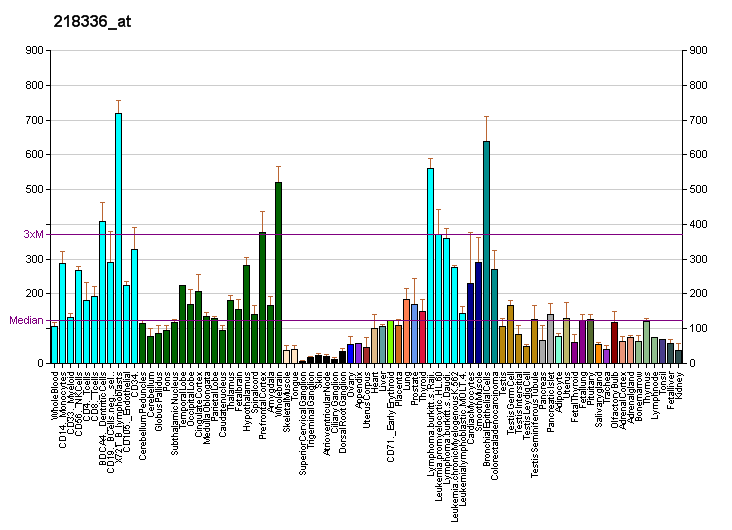
RNA expression pattern
Bgee	Human / Mouse (ortholog); Top expressed in: C1 segment; anterior cingulate cortex; anterior pituitary; ganglionic eminence; amygdala; gastrocnemius muscle; prefrontal cortex; Brodmann area 9; hypothalamus; putamen / Top expressed in: lateral hypothalamus; neural layer of retina; paraventricular nucleus of hypothalamus; central gray substance of midbrain; medial vestibular nucleus; ventromedial nucleus; dorsomedial hypothalamic nucleus; cingulate gyrus; mammillary body; supraoptic nucleus; More reference expression data
BioGPS	More reference expression data
Gene ontology
Molecular function	unfolded protein binding; protein folding chaperone activity; protein binding
Cellular component	cytoplasm; mitochondrion; nucleus; prefoldin complex; cytosol
Biological process	positive regulation of cytoskeleton organization; protein folding
Sources:Amigo / QuickGO
Orthologs
Databases	NCBI: entry; OMA: entry
Species	Human	Mouse
Entrez	5202	18637
Ensembl	ENSG00000143256	ENSMUSG00000006412
UniProt	Q9UHV9	O70591
RefSeq (mRNA)	NM_012394	NM_011070; NM_001360824; NM_001360825
RefSeq (protein)	NP_036526	NP_035200; NP_001347753; NP_001347754
Location (UCSC)	Chr 1: 161.1 – 161.12 Mb	Chr 1: 171.17 – 171.19 Mb
PubMed search
- Wikidata
View/Edit Human	View/Edit Mouse

Prefoldin subunit 2 is a protein that in humans is encoded by the PFDN2 gene.

This gene encodes a member of the prefoldin beta subunit family. The encoded protein is one of six subunits of prefoldin, a molecular chaperone complex that binds and stabilizes newly synthesized polypeptides, thereby allowing them to fold correctly. The complex, consisting of two alpha and four beta subunits, forms a double beta barrel assembly with six protruding coiled-coils.
