= AP3S1 =

Protein-coding gene in the species Homo sapiens

Identifiers
- Aliases: AP3S1, CLAPS3, Sigma3A, adaptor related protein complex 3 sigma 1 subunit, adaptor related protein complex 3 subunit sigma 1
- External IDs: OMIM: 601507; MGI: 1337062; GeneCards: AP3S1

Gene location (Human)
Chr.	Chromosome 5 (human)
Band	5q22.3-q23.1	Start	115,841,481 bp
Band	5q22.3-q23.1	End	115,914,081 bp

Gene location (Mouse)
Chr.	Chromosome 18 (mouse)
Band	18|18 C	Start	46,874,943 bp
Band	18|18 C	End	46,923,893 bp
RNA expression pattern
Bgee	Human / Mouse (ortholog); Top expressed in: Achilles tendon; hippocampus proper; superior frontal gyrus; anterior cingulate cortex; amygdala; dorsolateral prefrontal cortex; nucleus accumbens; ascending aorta; right coronary artery; tibial arteries / Top expressed in: ganglionic eminence; thymus; white adipose tissue; granulocyte; neural tube; ileum; mesencephalon; ventricular zone; jejunum; ovary; More reference expression data
BioGPS	n/a
Gene ontology
Molecular function	protein binding; transporter activity
Cellular component	AP-3 adaptor complex; membrane coat; Golgi apparatus; AP-type membrane coat adaptor complex; transport vesicle; cytoplasmic vesicle membrane; intracellular membrane-bounded organelle; membrane; cytoplasmic vesicle; axon cytoplasm
Biological process	anterograde axonal transport; protein transport; insulin receptor signaling pathway; anterograde synaptic vesicle transport; intracellular protein transport; vesicle-mediated transport
Sources:Amigo / QuickGO
Orthologs
Databases	NCBI: entry; OMA: entry
Species	Human	Mouse
Entrez	1176	11777
Ensembl	ENSG00000177879	ENSMUSG00000024480
UniProt	Q92572	Q9DCR2
RefSeq (mRNA)	NM_001002924; NM_001284; NM_001318090; NM_001318091; NM_001318093 NM_001318094	NM_009681; NM_001303015
RefSeq (protein)	NP_001002924; NP_001275; NP_001305019; NP_001305020; NP_001305022 NP_001305023; NP_001351048; NP_001351049; NP_001351051	NP_001289944; NP_033811
Location (UCSC)	Chr 5: 115.84 – 115.91 Mb	Chr 18: 46.87 – 46.92 Mb
PubMed search
- Wikidata
View/Edit Human	View/Edit Mouse

AP-3 complex subunit sigma-1 is a protein that in humans is encoded by the AP3S1 gene.
