= UBE2H =

Protein-coding gene in the species Homo sapiens

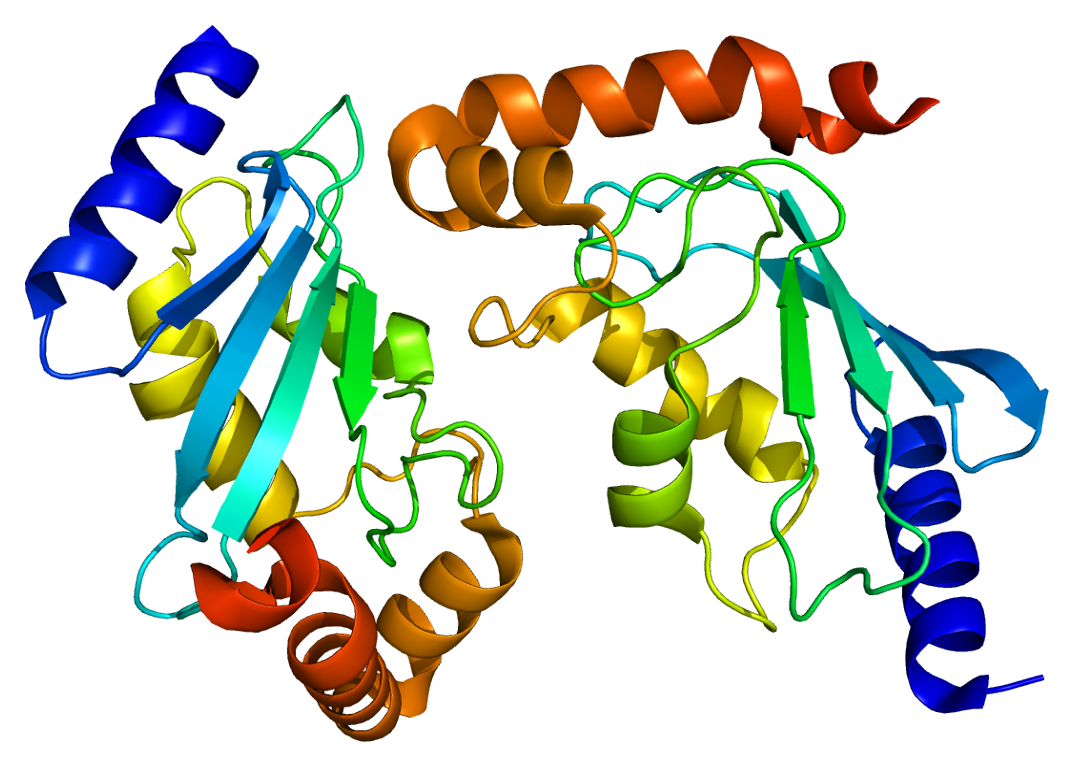

Identifiers
- Aliases: UBE2H, E2-20K, GID3, UBC8, UBCH, UBCH2, ubiquitin conjugating enzyme E2 H
- External IDs: OMIM: 601082; MGI: 104632; GeneCards: UBE2H
Available structures
PDB	Ortholog search: PDBe RCSB
PDB	List of PDB id codes 2Z5D
Enzyme activity
EC #	BRENDA	ExPASy	KEGG	MetaCyc
2.3.2.23	↗	↗	↗	↗
2.3.2.24	↗	↗	↗	↗

Gene location (Human)
Chr.	Chromosome 7 (human)
Band	7q32.2	Start	129,830,732 bp
Band	7q32.2	End	129,952,960 bp

Gene location (Mouse)
Chr.	Chromosome 6 (mouse)
Band	6 A3.3|6 12.52 cM	Start	30,211,288 bp
Band	6 A3.3|6 12.52 cM	End	30,304,538 bp
RNA expression pattern
Bgee	Human / Mouse (ortholog); Top expressed in: secondary oocyte; right adrenal cortex; epithelium of colon; saphenous vein; internal globus pallidus; Skeletal muscle tissue of biceps brachii; amniotic fluid; islet of Langerhans; left adrenal gland; caput epididymis / Top expressed in: blood; retinal pigment epithelium; Rostral migratory stream; tibiofemoral joint; substantia nigra; medullary collecting duct; ascending aorta; ciliary body; condyle; fossa; More reference expression data
BioGPS	n/a
Gene ontology
Molecular function	transferase activity; nucleotide binding; protein binding; ATP binding; ubiquitin conjugating enzyme activity; ubiquitin protein ligase binding; ubiquitin protein ligase activity; ubiquitin-protein transferase activity
Cellular component	cytoplasm; cytosol
Biological process	protein K48-linked ubiquitination; ubiquitin-dependent protein catabolic process; proteasome-mediated ubiquitin-dependent protein catabolic process; protein K11-linked ubiquitination; protein ubiquitination
Sources:Amigo / QuickGO
Orthologs
Databases	NCBI: entry; OMA: entry
Species	Human	Mouse
Entrez	7328	22214
Ensembl	ENSG00000186591	ENSMUSG00000039159
UniProt	P62256	P62257
RefSeq (mRNA)	NM_001202498; NM_003344; NM_182697	NM_001169576; NM_001169577; NM_009459
RefSeq (protein)	NP_001189427; NP_003335; NP_874356; NP_003335.1	NP_001163047; NP_001163048; NP_033485
Location (UCSC)	Chr 7: 129.83 – 129.95 Mb	Chr 6: 30.21 – 30.3 Mb
PubMed search
- Wikidata
View/Edit Human	View/Edit Mouse

Ubiquitin-conjugating enzyme E2 H is a protein that in humans is encoded by the UBE2H gene.

The modification of proteins with ubiquitin is an important cellular mechanism for targeting abnormal or short-lived proteins for degradation. Ubiquitination involves at least three classes of enzymes: ubiquitin-activating enzymes, or E1s, ubiquitin-conjugating enzymes, or E2s, and ubiquitin-protein ligases, or E3s. This gene encodes a member of the E2 ubiquitin-conjugating enzyme family. The encoded protein sequence is 100% identical to the mouse homolog and 98% identical to the frog and zebrafish homologs. Two alternatively spliced transcript variants have been found for this gene and they encode distinct isoforms.
