= RPS6KB2 =

Enzyme

Identifiers
- Aliases: RPS6KB2, KLS, P70-beta, P70-beta-1, P70-beta-2, S6K-beta2, S6K2, SRK, STK14B, p70(S6K)-beta, p70S6Kb, ribosomal protein S6 kinase B2, S6KB, S6KI(2), S6Kbeta
- External IDs: OMIM: 608939; MGI: 1927343; GeneCards: RPS6KB2
Enzyme activity
EC #	BRENDA	ExPASy	KEGG	MetaCyc
2.7.11.1	↗	↗	↗	↗

Gene location (Human)
Chr.	Chromosome 11 (human)
Band	11q13.2	Start	67,428,460 bp
Band	11q13.2	End	67,435,401 bp
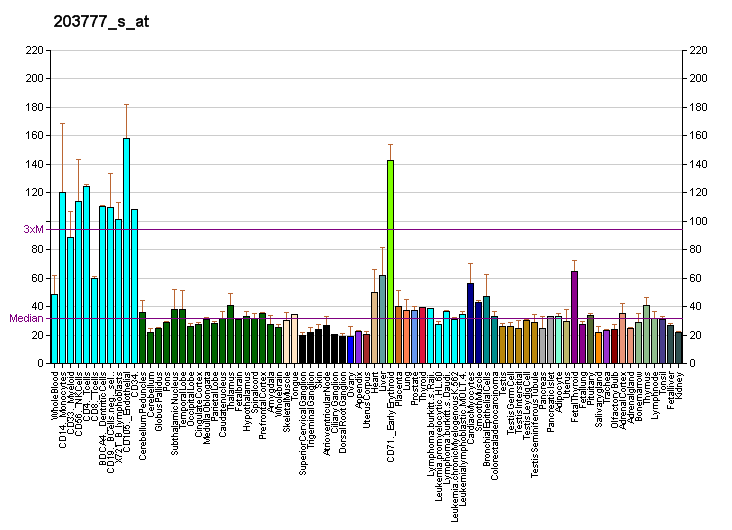
RNA expression pattern
Bgee	Human / Mouse (ortholog); Top expressed in: skin of leg; skin of abdomen; granulocyte; body of stomach; apex of heart; right lobe of liver; right hemisphere of cerebellum; anterior pituitary; muscle of thigh; mucosa of transverse colon / n/a; More reference expression data
BioGPS	More reference expression data
Gene ontology
Molecular function	transferase activity; protein kinase activity; nucleotide binding; peptide binding; kinase activity; protein serine/threonine kinase activity; ATP binding; ribosomal protein S6 kinase activity
Cellular component	cytoplasm; nucleoplasm; nucleus
Biological process	intracellular signal transduction; protein biosynthesis; phosphorylation; protein phosphorylation; positive regulation of translational initiation; signal transduction; protein kinase B signaling; TOR signaling
Sources:Amigo / QuickGO
Orthologs
Databases	NCBI: entry; OMA: entry
Species	Human	Mouse
Entrez	6199	58988
Ensembl	ENSG00000175634	ENSMUSG00000024830
UniProt	Q9UBS0	Q9Z1M4
RefSeq (mRNA)	NM_001007071; NM_003952	NM_021485
RefSeq (protein)	NP_003943	NP_067460.1
Location (UCSC)	Chr 11: 67.43 – 67.44 Mb	n/a
PubMed search
- Wikidata
View/Edit Human	View/Edit Mouse

Ribosomal protein S6 kinase beta-2 is an enzyme that in humans is encoded by the RPS6KB2 gene.

This gene encodes a member of the RSK (ribosomal S6 kinase) family of serine/threonine kinases. This kinase contains two nonidentical kinase catalytic domains and phosphorylates the S6 ribosomal protein and eucaryotic translation initiation factor 4B (eIF4B). Phosphorylation of S6 leads to an increase in protein synthesis and cell proliferation.
