= Protein phosphatase 2 =

Class of enzyme complexes

protein phosphatase 2, catalytic subunit, alpha isoform
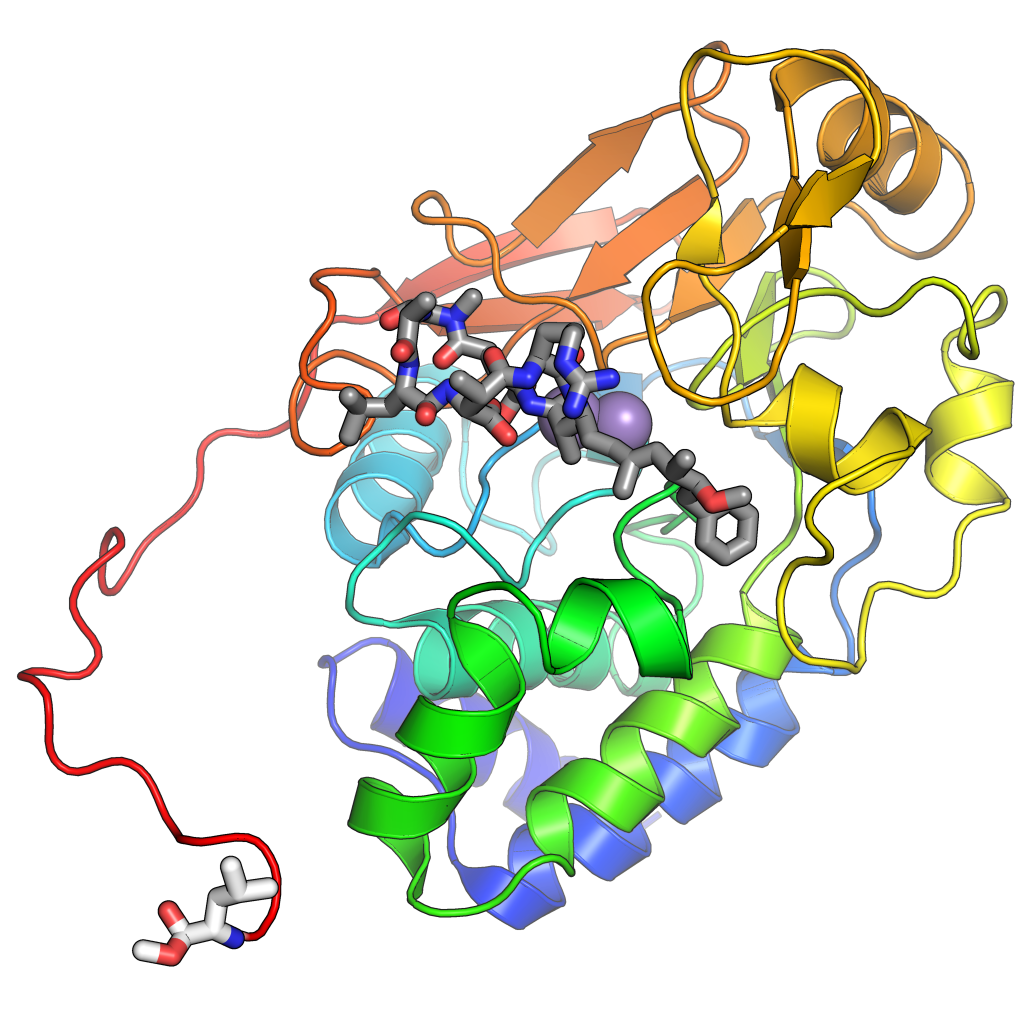
- The catalytic (C) subunit of protein phosphatase 2A. The protein is shown in rainbow color with the N-terminus in blue and the C-terminus in red. The methylated carboxyl group of the C-terminal leucine residue is shown in white. The purple spheres are two catalytically required manganese ions and the dark gray compound at center is a peptidomimetic toxin, microcystin, occupying the active site. From PDB: 2IAE.

Identifiers
- Symbol: PPP2CA
- NCBI gene: 5515
- HGNC: 9299
- OMIM: 176915
- RefSeq: NM_002715
- UniProt: P67775

Other data
- EC number: 3.1.3.16
- Locus: Chr. 5 q23-q31
Search for
- Structures: Swiss-model
- Domains: InterPro

protein phosphatase 2, catalytic subunit, beta isoform

Identifiers
- Symbol: PPP2CB
- NCBI gene: 5516
- HGNC: 9300
- OMIM: 176916
- RefSeq: NM_001009552
- UniProt: P62714

Other data
- EC number: 3.1.3.16
- Locus: Chr. 8 p12
Search for
- Structures: Swiss-model
- Domains: InterPro

Protein phosphatase 2 (PP2), also known as PP2A, is an enzyme that in humans is encoded by the PPP2CA gene. The PP2A heterotrimeric protein phosphatase is ubiquitously expressed, accounting for a large fraction of phosphatase activity in eukaryotic cells. Its serine/threonine phosphatase activity has a broad substrate specificity and diverse cellular functions. Among the targets of PP2A are proteins of oncogenic signaling cascades, such as Raf, MEK, and AKT, where PP2A may act as a tumor suppressor.

== Structure and function ==
PP2A consists of a dimeric core enzyme composed of the structural A and catalytic C subunits, and a regulatory B subunit. When the PP2A catalytic C subunit associates with the A and B subunits several species of holoenzymes are produced with distinct functions and characteristics. The A subunit, a founding member of the HEAT repeat protein family (huntingtin, EF3, PP2A, TOR1), is the scaffold required for the formation of the heterotrimeric complex. When the A subunit binds it alters the enzymatic activity of the catalytic subunit, even if the B subunit is absent. While C and A subunit sequences show remarkable sequence conservation throughout eukaryotes, regulatory B subunits are more heterogeneous and are believed to play key roles in controlling the localization and specific activity of different holoenzymes. Multicellular eukaryotes express four classes of variable regulatory subunits: B (PR55), B′ (B56 or PR61), B″ (PR72), and B‴ (PR93/PR110), with at least 16 members in these subfamilies. In addition, accessory proteins and post-translational modifications (such as methylation) control PP2A subunit associations and activities.

The two catalytic metal ions located in PP2A's active site are manganese.

Function	Protein	Description	Note
Structural subunit A	PPP2R1A	PP2A 65 kDa regulatory subunit A alpha isoform	subunit A, PR65-alpha isoform
Structural subunit A	PPP2R1B	PP2A 65 kDa regulatory subunit A beta isoform	subunit A, PR65-beta isoform
Regulatory subunit B	PPP2R2A	PP2A 55 kDa regulatory subunit B alpha isoform	subunit B, B-alpha isoform
Regulatory subunit B	PPP2R2B	PP2A 55 kDa regulatory subunit B beta isoform	subunit B, B-beta isoform
Regulatory subunit B	PPP2R2C	PP2A 55 kDa regulatory subunit B gamma isoform	subunit B, B-gamma isoform
Regulatory subunit B	PPP2R2D	PP2A 55 kDa regulatory subunit B delta isoform	subunit B, B-delta isoform
Regulatory subunit B	PPP2R3A	PP2A 72/130 kDa regulatory subunit B	subunit B, B''-PR72/PR130
Regulatory subunit B	PPP2R3B	PP2A 48 kDa regulatory subunit B	subunit B, PR48 isoform
Regulatory subunit B	PPP2R3C	PP2A regulatory subunit B'' subunit gamma	subunit G5PR
Regulatory subunit B	PPP2R4	PP2A regulatory subunit B'	subunit B', PR53 isoform
Regulatory subunit B	PPP2R5A	PP2A 56 kDa regulatory subunit alpha isoform	subunit B, B' alpha isoform
Regulatory subunit B	PPP2R5B	PP2A 56 kDa regulatory subunit beta isoform	subunit B, B' beta isoform
Regulatory subunit B	PPP2R5C	PP2A 56 kDa regulatory subunit gamma isoform	subunit B, B' gamma isoform
Regulatory subunit B	PPP2R5D	PP2A 56 kDa regulatory subunit delta isoform	subunit B, B' delta isoform
Regulatory subunit B	PPP2R5E	PP2A 56 kDa regulatory subunit epsilon isoform	subunit B, B' epsilon isoform
Catalytic subunit C	PPP2CA	catalytic subunit alpha isoform	
Catalytic subunit C	PPP2CB	catalytic subunit beta isoform	

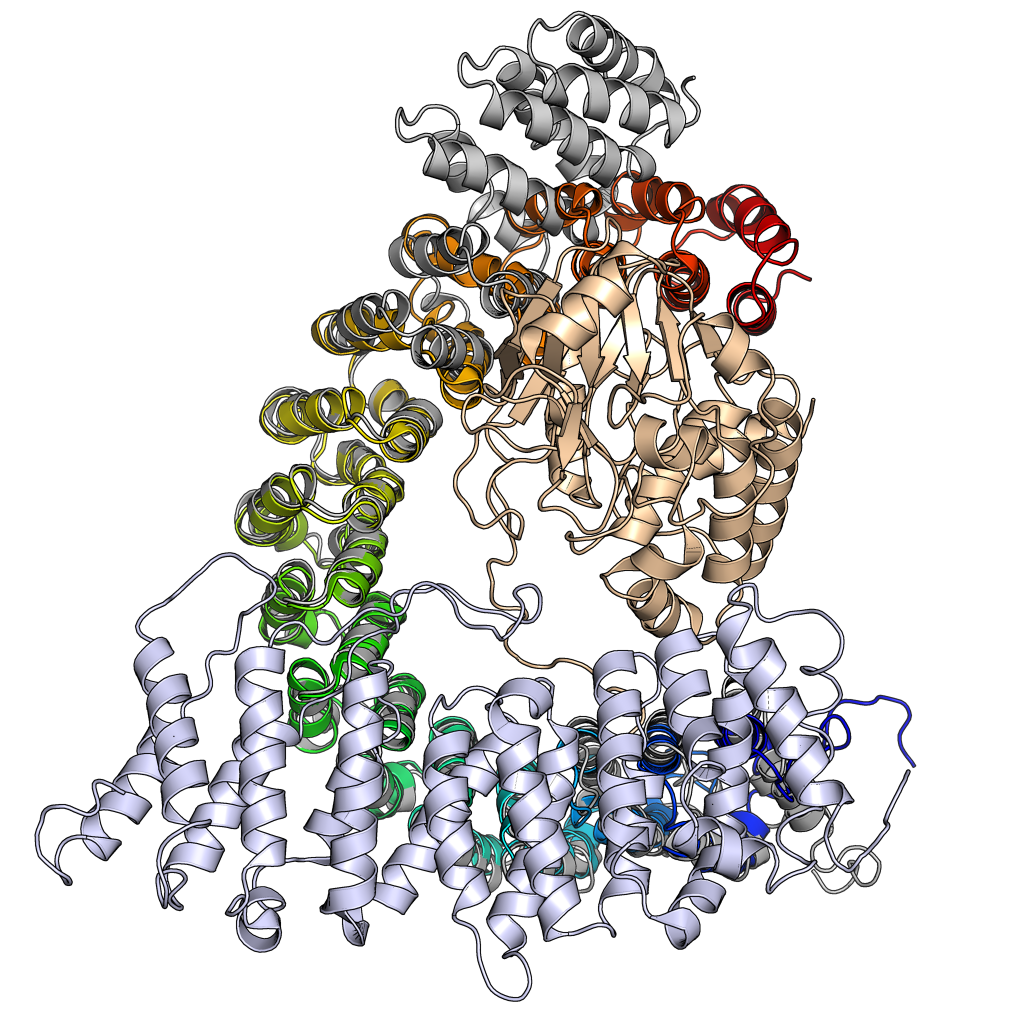
The assembled heterotrimer of protein phosphatase 2A. The structural subunit A, consisting of 15 HEAT repeats, is shown in rainbow color with the N-terminus in blue at bottom and the C-terminus in red at top. The regulatory subunit B (B' gamma), consisting of irregular pseudo-HEAT repeats, is shown in light blue. The catalytic subunit C is shown in tan. (All from PDB: 2IAE.) Superposed is the unbound form of the regulatory subunit A in gray (from PDB: 1B3U), illustrating the flexibility of this alpha solenoid protein. Conformational changes in HEAT repeat 11 result in flexing the C-terminal end of the protein to accommodate binding of the catalytic subunit.

== Drug discovery ==
PP2 has been identified as a potential biological target to discover drugs to treat Parkinson's disease and Alzheimer's disease, however as of 2014 it was unclear which isoforms would be most beneficial to target, and also whether activation or inhibition would be most therapeutic.

PP2 has also been identified as a tumor suppressor for blood cancers, and as of 2015 programs were underway to identify compounds that could either directly activate it, or that could inhibit other proteins that suppress its activity.

In preclinical models, inhibition of the PP2A catalytic subunit C has been demonstrated to stimulate anti-tumor immunity.
