= Protein kinase R =

Human protein and coding gene

EIF2AK2
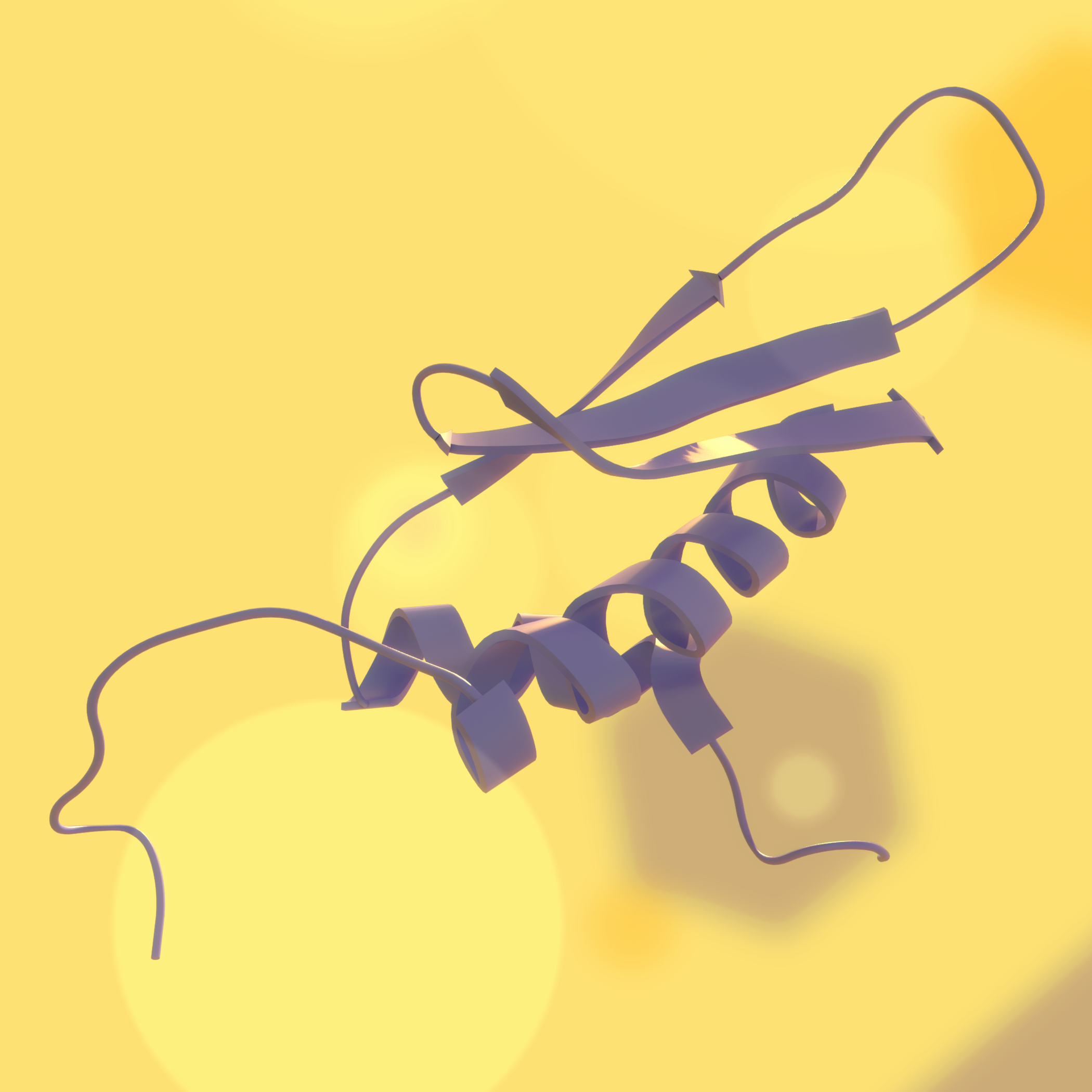
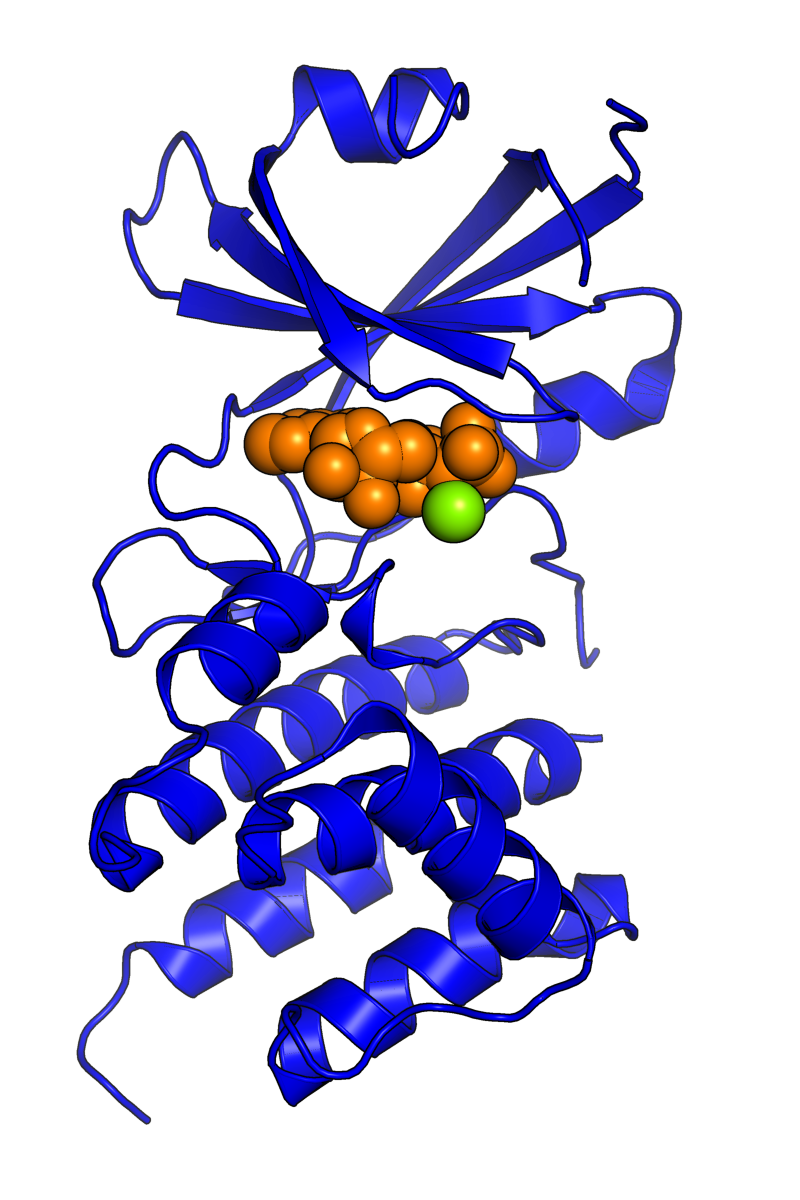

Identifiers
- Aliases: EIF2AK2, PKR, PPP1R83, PRKR, eukaryotic translation initiation factor 2 alpha kinase 2, LEUDEN, DYT33
- External IDs: OMIM: 176871; MGI: 1353449; GeneCards: EIF2AK2
Available structures
PDB	Ortholog search: PDBe RCSB
PDB	List of PDB id codes 3UIU, 1QU6, 2A19, 2A1A
Enzyme activity
EC #	BRENDA	ExPASy	KEGG	MetaCyc
2.7.10.2	↗	↗	↗	↗
2.7.11.1	↗	↗	↗	↗

Gene location (Human)
Chr.	Chromosome 2 (human)
Band	2p22.2	Start	37,099,210 bp
Band	2p22.2	End	37,157,522 bp

Gene location (Mouse)
Chr.	Chromosome 17 (mouse)
Band	17 E3|17 49.56 cM	Start	79,159,993 bp
Band	17 E3|17 49.56 cM	End	79,190,002 bp
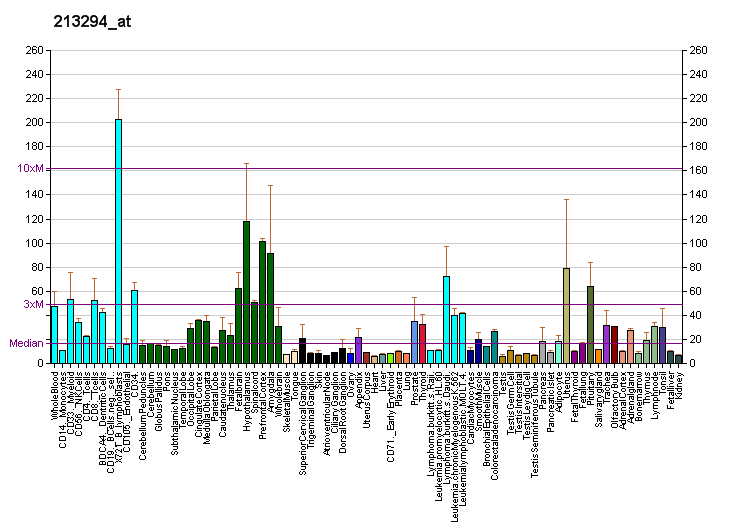

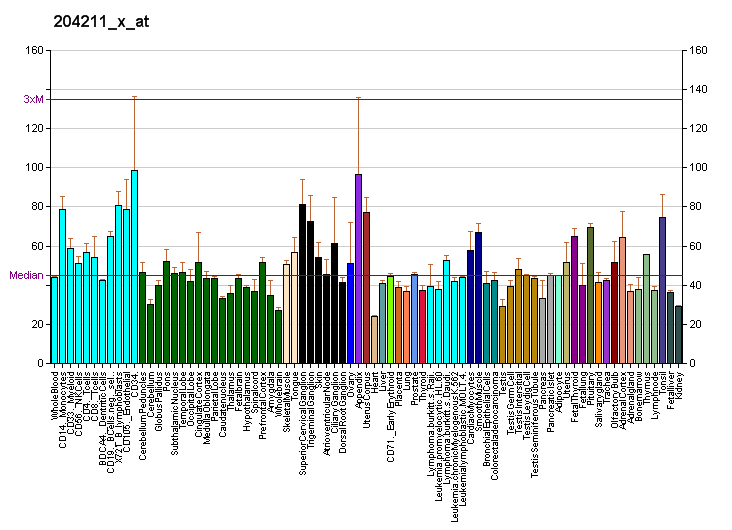
RNA expression pattern
Bgee	Human / Mouse (ortholog); Top expressed in: buccal mucosa cell; Epithelium of choroid plexus; Achilles tendon; endothelial cell; parietal pleura; trigeminal ganglion; entorhinal cortex; postcentral gyrus; visceral pleura; tail of epididymis / Top expressed in: granulocyte; medullary collecting duct; stroma of bone marrow; duodenum; tail of embryo; lumbar spinal ganglion; uterus; left colon; fetal liver hematopoietic progenitor cell; ileum; More reference expression data
BioGPS	More reference expression data
Gene ontology
Molecular function	transferase activity; protein kinase activity; nucleotide binding; non-membrane spanning protein tyrosine kinase activity; kinase activity; protein serine/threonine kinase activity; protein binding; double-stranded RNA binding; protein tyrosine kinase activity; ATP binding; eukaryotic translation initiation factor 2alpha kinase activity; protein phosphatase regulator activity; RNA binding; identical protein binding
Cellular component	cytoplasm; ribosome; membrane; perinuclear region of cytoplasm; nucleus; cytosol; cytosolic ribosome
Biological process	negative regulation of translation; regulation of hematopoietic stem cell proliferation; regulation of transcription, DNA-templated; protein biosynthesis; positive regulation of cytokine production; immune system process; phosphorylation; cellular response to amino acid starvation; negative regulation of apoptotic process; positive regulation of NIK/NF-kappaB signaling; transcription, DNA-templated; endoplasmic reticulum unfolded protein response; protein phosphorylation; negative regulation of viral genome replication; regulation of hematopoietic stem cell differentiation; regulation of hematopoietic progenitor cell differentiation; positive regulation of NF-kappaB transcription factor activity; defense response to virus; response to interferon-alpha; positive regulation of chemokine production; negative regulation of osteoblast proliferation; protein autophosphorylation; regulation of NLRP3 inflammasome complex assembly; peptidyl-tyrosine phosphorylation; innate immune response; viral process; response to toxic substance; positive regulation of stress-activated MAPK cascade; response to virus; regulation of translational initiation by eIF2 alpha phosphorylation; regulation of apoptotic process; negative regulation of cell population proliferation; regulation of phosphoprotein phosphatase activity
Sources:Amigo / QuickGO
Orthologs
Databases	NCBI: entry; OMA: entry
Species	Human	Mouse
Entrez	5610	19106
Ensembl	ENSG00000055332	ENSMUSG00000024079
UniProt	P19525	Q03963
RefSeq (mRNA)	NM_001135651; NM_001135652; NM_002759	NM_011163
RefSeq (protein)	NP_001129123; NP_001129124; NP_002750	NP_035293
Location (UCSC)	Chr 2: 37.1 – 37.16 Mb	Chr 17: 79.16 – 79.19 Mb
PubMed search
- Wikidata
View/Edit Human	View/Edit Mouse

Protein kinase RNA-activated also known as protein kinase R (PKR), interferon-induced, double-stranded RNA-activated protein kinase, or eukaryotic translation initiation factor 2-alpha kinase 2 (EIF2AK2) is an enzyme that in humans is encoded by the EIF2AK2 gene on chromosome 2. PKR is a serine/tyrosine kinase that is 551 amino acids long.

PKR is inducible by various mechanisms of stress and protects against viral infections. It also has a role in several signaling pathways.

== Mechanism of action ==
Protein kinase-R is activated by double-stranded RNA (dsRNA), introduced to the cells by a viral infection. In situations of viral infection, the dsRNA created by viral replication and gene expression binds to the N-terminal domain, activating the protein. PKR activation via dsRNA is length dependent, requiring the dsRNA to be 30 bp in length to bind to PKR molecules. However, excess dsRNA can diminish activation of PKR. Binding to dsRNA is believed to activate PKR by inducing dimerization of the kinase domains and subsequent auto-phosphorylation reactions. It is not yet established whether PKR activates in cis, with a protomer's activation loop reaching into its own catalytic site, or in trans, with the activation loop being phosphorylated in a face to face geometry by a conjugate protomer. PKR can also be activated by the protein PACT via phosphorylation of S287 on its M3 domain. The promoter region of PKR has interferon-stimulated response elements to which Type I interferons (IFN) bind to induce the transcription of PKR genes. Some research suggests that PKR can be stimulated by heat shock proteins, heparin, growth factors, bacterial infection, pro-inflammatory cytokines, reactive oxygen species, DNA damage, mechanical stress, and excess nutrient intake.

Once active, PKR is able to phosphorylate the eukaryotic translation initiation factor eIF2α. This inhibits further cellular mRNA translation, thereby preventing viral protein synthesis. Overall, this leads to apoptosis of virally infected cells to prevent further viral spread. PKR can also induce apoptosis in bacterial infection by responding to LPS and proinflammatory cytokines. Apoptosis can also occur via PKR activation of the FADD and caspase signaling pathway.

PKR also has pro-inflammatory functions, as it can mediate the activation of the transcription factor NF-kB, by phosphorylating its inhibitory subunit, IkB. This leads to the expression of adhesion molecules and transcription factors that activate them, which induce inflammation responses such as the secretion of pro-inflammatory cytokines. PKR also activates several mitogen-activated protein kinases (MAPK) to lead to inflammation.

To balance the effects of apoptosis and inflammation, PKR has regulatory functions. Active PKR is also able to activate tumor suppressor PP2A which regulates the cell cycle and the metabolism. There is also evidence that PKR is autophagic as a regulatory mechanism.

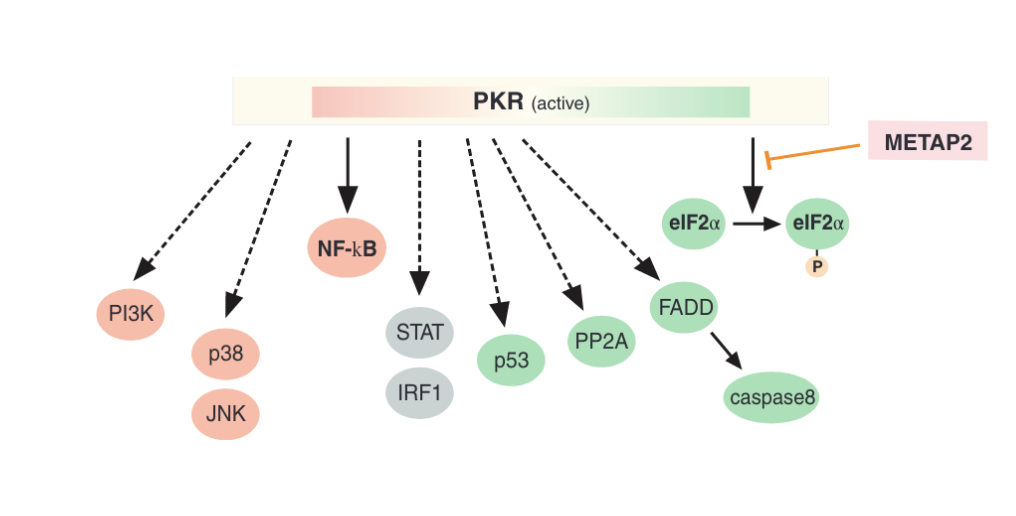
Figure showing the different signaling pathways that activated PKR plays a role in. Most results of these pathways help in fighting off viral infection and regulating the immune response, conferring PKR with apoptotic and pro-inflammatory functionality.

== PKR stress pathway ==
PKR is in the center of cellular response to different stress signals such as pathogens, lack of nutrients, cytokines, irradiation, mechanical stress, or ER stress. The PKR pathway leads to a stress response through activation of other stress pathways such as JNK, p38, NFkB, PP2A and phosphorylation of eIF2α. ER stress caused by excess of unfolded proteins leads to inflammatory responses. PKR contributes to this response by interacting with several inflammatory kinases such as IKK, JNK, ElF2α, insulin receptors and others. This metabolically activated inflammatory complex is called metabolic inflammasome or metaflammasome. Via the JNK signaling pathway, PKR also plays a role in insulin resistance, diabetes, and obesity by phosphorylating IRS1. Inhibiting PKR in mice led to lower inflammation in adipose tissues, increased sensitivity to insulin, and amelioration of diabetic symptoms. PKR also participates in the mitochondrial unfolded protein response (UPR^{mt}). Here, PKR is induced via the transcription factor AP-1 and activated independently of PACT. In this context, PKR has been shown to be relevant to intestinal inflammation.

== Viral defense ==
Viruses have developed many mechanisms to counteract the PKR mechanism. It may be done by Decoy dsRNA, degradation, hiding of viral dsRNA, dimerization block, dephosphorylation of substrate or by a pseudosubstrate. Some mechanisms are still unknown, for instance, in Lymphocytic choriomeningitis virus infection the virus is not recognized by PKR, and the current anti-dsRNA antibodies have limitation in detecting dsRNA species of negative stranded RNA viruses, which necessitates the use of a different approach to understand this viral defense mechanism.

For instance, Epstein–Barr virus (EBV) uses the gene EBER1 to produce decoy dsRNA. This leads to cancers such as Burkitt's lymphoma, Hodgkin's disease, nasopharyngeal carcinoma and various leukemias.

Viral defense mechanisms against PKR
Defense type	Virus	Molecule
Decoy dsRNA	Adenovirus	VAI RNA
Decoy dsRNA	Epstein–Barr virus	EBER
Decoy dsRNA	HIV	TAR
PKR degradation	Poliovirus	2A^{pro}
Hide viral dsRNA	Vaccinia virus	E3L
Hide viral dsRNA	Reovirus	σ3
Hide viral dsRNA	Influenza virus	NS1
Dimerization block	Influenza virus	p58^{IPK}
Dimerization block	Hepatitis C virus	NS5A
Pseudosubstrate	Vaccinia virus	K3L
Pseudosubstrate	HIV	Tat
Dephosphorylation of substrate	Herpes simplex virus	ICP34.5
Unknown mechanism	Lymphocytic choriomeningitis virus	NP

== Memory and learning ==
PKR knockout mice or inhibition of PKR in mice enhances memory and learning.

== Neuronal degeneration disease ==
First report in 2002 has been shown that immunohistochemical marker for phosphorylated PKR and eIF2α was displayed positively in degenerating neurons in the hippocampus and the frontal cortex of patients with Alzheimer's disease (AD), suggesting the link between PKR and AD. Additionally, many of these neurons were also immunostained with an antibody for phosphorylated Tau protein. Activated PKR was specifically found in the cytoplasm and nucleus, as well as co-localized with neuronal apoptotic markers. Further studies have assessed the levels of PKR in blood and cerebrospinal fluid (CSF) of AD patients and controls. The result of an analysis of the concentrations of total and phosphorylated PKR (pPKR) in peripheral blood mononuclear cells (PBMCs) in 23 AD patients and 19 control individuals showed statistically significant increased levels of the ratio of phosphorylated PKR/PKR in AD patients compared with controls. Assessments of CSF biomarkers, such as Aβ1-42, Aβ1-40, Tau, and phosphorylated Tau at threonine 181, have been a validated use in clinical research and in routine practice to determine whether patients have CSF abnormalities and AD brain lesions. A study found that "total PKR and pPKR concentrations were elevated in AD and amnestic mild cognitive impairment subjects with a pPKR value (optical density units) discriminating AD patients from control subjects with a sensitivity of 91.1% and a specificity of 94.3%. Among AD patients, total PKR and pPKR levels correlate with CSF p181tau levels. Some AD patients with normal CSF Aß, T-tau, or p181tau levels had abnormal total PKR and pPKR levels". It was concluded that the PKR-eIF2α pro-apoptotic pathway could be involved in neuronal degeneration that leads to various neuropathological lesions as a function of neuronal susceptibility.

PKR and beta amyloid

Activation of PKR can cause accumulation of amyloid β-peptide (Aβ) via de-repression of BACE1 (β-site APP Cleaving Enzyme) expression in Alzheimer Disease patients. Normally, the 5′ untranslated region (5′ UTR) in the BACE1 promoter would fundamentally inhibit the expression of BACE1 gene. However, BACE1 expression can be activated by phosphorylation of eIF2a, which reverses the inhibitory effect exerted by BACE1 5′ UTR. Phosphorylation of eIF2a is triggered by activation of PKR. Viral infection such as herpes simplex virus (HSV) or oxidative stress can both increase BACE1 expression through activation of PKR-eIF2a pathway.

In addition, the increased activity of BACE1 could also lead to β-cleaved carboxy-terminal fragment of β-Amyloid precursor protein (APP-βCTF) induced dysfunction of endosomes in AD. Endosomes are highly active β-Amyloid precursor protein (APP) processing sites, and endosome abnormalities are associated with upregulated expression of early endosomal regulator, Rab5. These are the earliest known disease-specific neuronal response in AD. Increased activity of BACE1 leads to synthesis of the APP-βCTF. An elevated level of βCTF then causes Rab5 overactivation. βCTF recruits APPL1 to rab5 endosomes, where it stabilizes active GTP-Rab5, leading to pathologically accelerated endocytosis, endosome swelling and selectively impaired axonal transport of Rab5 endosomes.

PKR and Tau phosphorylation

It is reported earlier that phosphorylated PKR could co-localize with phosphorylated Tau protein in affected neurons. A protein phosphatase-2A inhibitor (PP2A inhibitor) – okadaic acid (OA) – is known to increase tau phosphorylation, Aβ deposition and neuronal death. It is studied that OA also induces PKR phosphorylation and thus, eIF2a phosphorylation. eIF2a phosphorylation then induces activation of transcription factor 4 (ATF4), which induces apoptosis and nuclear translocation, contributing to neuronal death.

Glycogen synthase kinase 3β (GSK-3β) is responsible for tau phosphorylation and controls several cellular functions including apoptosis. Another study demonstrated that tunicamycin or Aβ treatment can induce PKR activation in human neuroblastoma cells and can trigger GSK3β activation, as well as tau phosphorylation. They found that in AD brains, both activated PKR and GSK3β co-localize with phosphorylated tau in neurons. In SH-SY5Y cell cultures, tunicamycin and Aβ(1-42) activate PKR, which then can modulate GSK-3β activation and induce tau phosphorylation, apoptosis. All these processes are attenuated by PKR inhibitors or PKR siRNA. PKR could represent a crucial signaling point relaying stress signals to neuronal pathways by interacting with transcription factor or indirectly controlling GSK3β activation, leading to cellular degeneration in AD.

== Fetal alcohol syndrome ==
PKR also mediates ethanol-induced protein synthesis inhibition and apoptosis which is linked to fetal alcohol syndrome.

== Interactions ==
Protein kinase R has been shown to interact with:

- ASK1,
- DNAJC3,
- ILF3,
- METAP2,
- P53,
- PPP1CA,
- PRKRA,
- STAT1, and
- TARBP2.
