= Wolcott–Rallison syndrome =

- Other names: Early-onset diabetes mellitus with multiple epiphyseal dysplasia
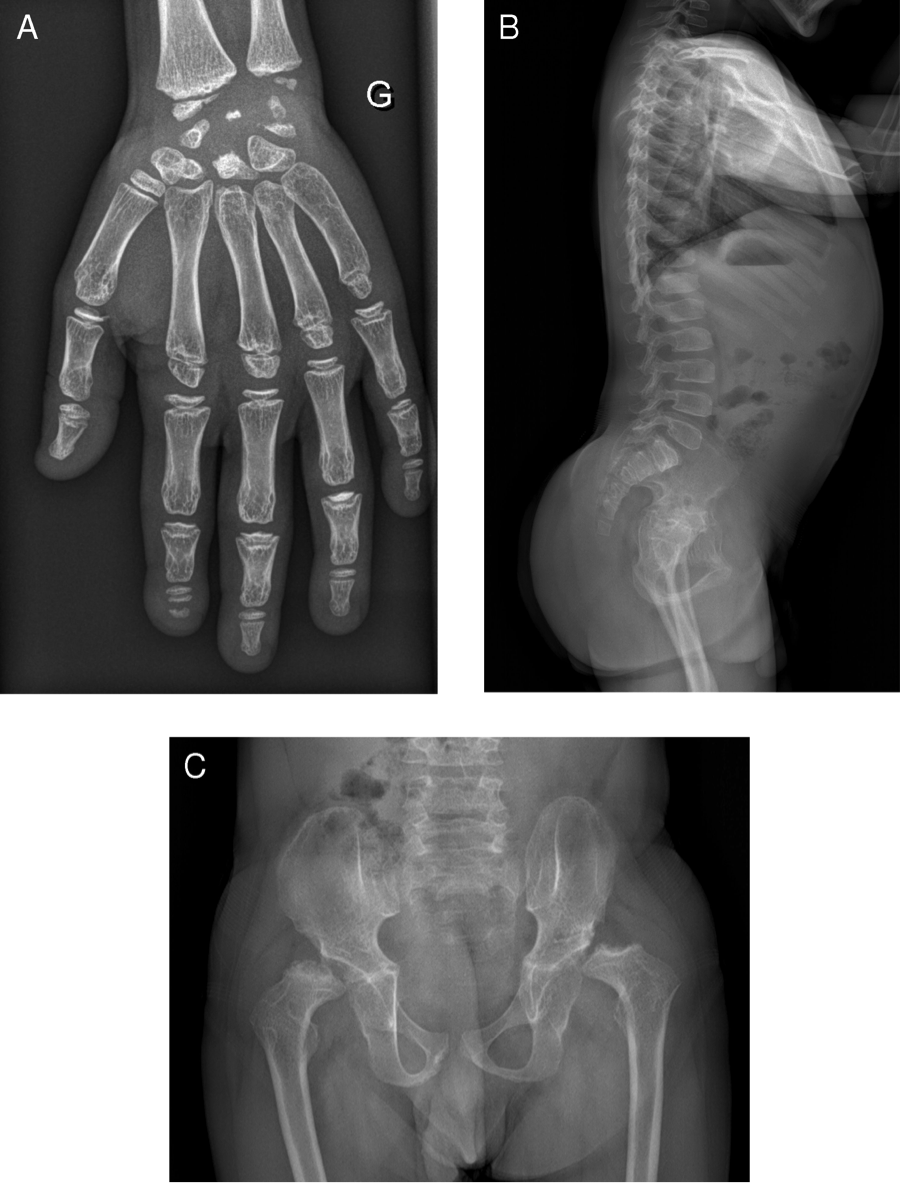
- Radiograph of a WRS child presenting with dysplastic bone growth in various regions of the body.
- Frequency: 0.0001%

Wolcott–Rallison syndrome, WRS, is a rare, autosomal recessive disorder with infancy-onset diabetes mellitus, multiple epiphyseal dysplasia, osteopenia, mental retardation or developmental delay, and hepatic and renal dysfunction as main clinical findings. Patients with WRS have mutations in the EIF2AK3 gene, which encodes the eukaryotic translation initiation factor 2-alpha kinase 3 also known as PERK. WRS is a rare monogenic disease with only 189 cases reported as of 2023, and 138 of these cases were from consanguineous parents. The median life expectancy is 36 months (3 years), and only a few individuals have survived past 10 years. The majority of WRS patients die from fulminant hepatitis during childhood.

== Genetics ==
The Wolcott-Rallison Syndrome is a rare, monogenic autosomal recessive disorder caused by mutations in the EIF2AK3 gene (also known as Perk) which encodes the PERK (pancreatic endoplasmic reticulum kinase). Located on the short arm of chromosome 2 (2p11.2), various pathogenic variants - including missense and nonsense mutation - have been identified across unrelated families.

Delépine and coworkers first discovered that the WRS was caused by mutations in EIF2AK3 shortly after the discovery of the EIF2AK3 gene and encoded PERK protein. After these initial discoveries, the function of PERK was first investigated using PERK deficient cultured cells, which showed that PERK was an integral component of the ER stress/Unfolded Protein Response (UPR) pathway. Based on cell culture experiments, the complex dysfunctions seen in WRS were proposed to arise from molecular and biochemical dysfunctions of the ER stress/UPR pathway. Subsequently EIF2AK3 mutant strains of mice were created to provide an animal model of WRS. Mice deficient for PERK exhibit all of the same dysfunctions as human WRS and have provided an experimental system to unravel the underlying cause of each of these defects. Unexpectedly, the underlying cause of WRS dysfunctions appears to be unrelated to the ER stress/UPR pathway. Specifically, these studies showed that (1) diabetes is caused by a cell autonomous defect in the insulin-secreting pancreatic beta cells, resulting from a defects in beta cell proliferation and insulin synthesis, processing, and secretion, (2) postnatal growth retardation is caused by a deficiency in circulating insulin-like growth factor 1 (IGF-1) produced by the liver, (3) exocrine pancreatic insufficiency (EPI) is caused a postnatal oncotic cell death of the acinar cells of the exocrine pancreas, (4) skeletal dysplasia and osteopenia are caused by multiple factors including defects in collagen synthesis and secretion and low circulating levels of insulin and IGF-1, and (5) acute liver dysfunction is an indirect consequence of the absence of normally regulated insulin secretion from the endocrine pancreas.

== Diagnosis ==
Initially, patients with neonatal or early-childhood onset diabetes are possible candidates for having Wolcott–Rallison syndrome. The other features include multiple epiphyseal dysplasia, osteopenia, intellectual disability, and hepatic and renal dysfunction. The determination of WRS is confirmed by genetic testing for EIKF2AK3 mutations. Molecular genetic analysis can be done for the patient and the parents to test for inherited or de novo mutations. X-rays can show bone age in relation to actual age. In typical WRS patients the bone age is a few years less than the chronological age. Hypothyroidism is rare in WRS patients but can occur.

== Treatment ==
The hyperglycemia and diabetes is managed using an insulin pump. In infants and very young children long-acting insulins like Glargine and Levemir are preferred to prevent recurrent hypoglycemia. Careful monitoring of blood glucose levels and frequent check-up with the patients health care providers are advised to monitor kidney and liver function and adjust insulin treatment. In the few cases that develop hypothyroidism, treatment with thyroxine is indicated, with the target to maintain normal circulating thyroid stimulating hormone (thyrotropin) concentrations. Recurrent non-viral hepatitis and acute liver failure (ALF) are reported in most WRS patients starting as early as one year old. Treatment ALF in WRS patients typically includes intravenous rehydration, strict glycemic control, and intravenous treatment with N-acetylcysteine (NAC), an anti-oxidant.

Nine WRS patients have received donor organ transplants, involving the liver alone; the liver and pancreas; or a triple transplant of the liver, pancreas, and kidney. Post transplant, these patient have largely avoided recurrent ALF, and those who received a pancreas have successfully regained glycemic control. Studies of the WRS mouse model showed that restoring PERK function exclusively in the pancreatic beta cells prevents acute liver failure and reverses diabetes. Consequently, transplanting pancreatic islets of Langerhans — containing the insulin-secreting beta cells — may be an appropriate treatment of WRS.
