= RBM14 =

Protein-coding gene in the species Homo sapiens

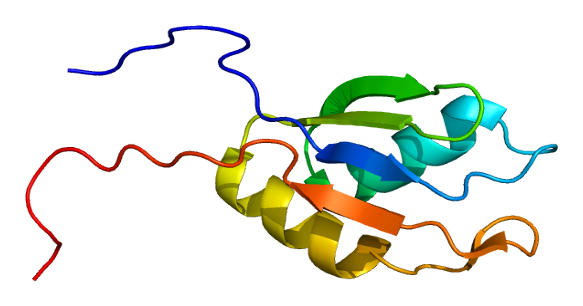

Identifiers
- Aliases: RBM14, COAA, PSP2, SIP, SYTIP1, TMEM137, RNA binding motif protein 14
- External IDs: OMIM: 612409; MGI: 1929092; GeneCards: RBM14
Available structures
PDB	Ortholog search: PDBe RCSB
PDB	List of PDB id codes 2DNP

Gene location (Human)
Chr.	Chromosome 11 (human)
Band	11q13.2	Start	66,616,626 bp
Band	11q13.2	End	66,629,934 bp

Gene location (Mouse)
Chr.	Chromosome 19 (mouse)
Band	19|19 A	Start	4,850,597 bp
Band	19|19 A	End	4,861,662 bp
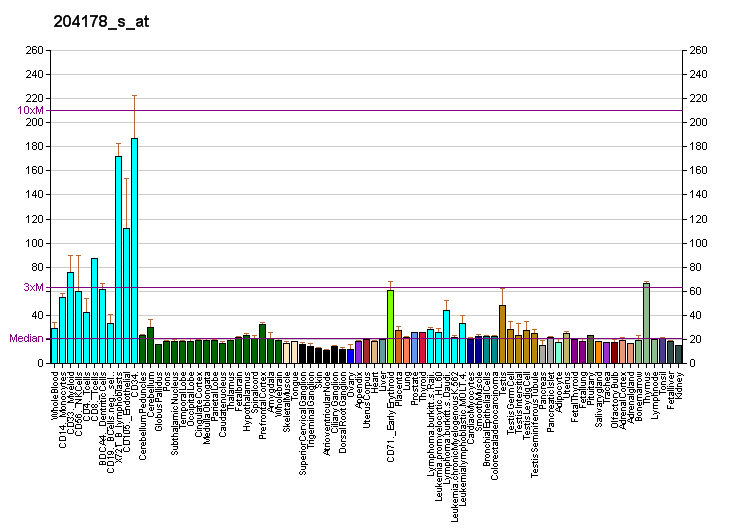
RNA expression pattern
Bgee	Human / Mouse (ortholog); Top expressed in: right uterine tube; right hemisphere of cerebellum; left ovary; right ovary; right testis; ventricular zone; left testis; ganglionic eminence; mucosa of transverse colon; canal of the cervix / Top expressed in: internal carotid artery; external carotid artery; condyle; primitive streak; cumulus cell; Paneth cell; fossa; Ileal epithelium; ureter; renal corpuscle; More reference expression data
BioGPS	More reference expression data
Gene ontology
Molecular function	protein binding; protein-macromolecule adaptor activity; transcription coregulator activity; nuclear receptor coactivator activity; nucleic acid binding; RNA binding
Cellular component	nucleolus; mediator complex; transcription regulator complex; cytoplasm; nucleus; nuclear speck; nucleoplasm; ribonucleoprotein complex
Biological process	glucocorticoid receptor signaling pathway; response to hormone; SMAD protein signal transduction; DNA recombination; DNA repair; regulation of transcription, DNA-templated; DNA replication; intracellular estrogen receptor signaling pathway; transcription, DNA-templated; negative regulation of centriole replication; histone deacetylation; positive regulation of transcription by RNA polymerase II; centriole assembly; activation of innate immune response; immune system process; innate immune response
Sources:Amigo / QuickGO
Orthologs
Databases	NCBI: entry; OMA: entry
Species	Human	Mouse
Entrez	10432	56275
Ensembl	ENSG00000239306	ENSMUSG00000006456
UniProt	Q96PK6	Q8C2Q3
RefSeq (mRNA)	NM_032886; NM_001198836; NM_001198837; NM_006328	NM_019869
RefSeq (protein)	NP_001185765; NP_001185766; NP_006319	NP_063922
Location (UCSC)	Chr 11: 66.62 – 66.63 Mb	Chr 19: 4.85 – 4.86 Mb
PubMed search
- Wikidata
View/Edit Human	View/Edit Mouse

RNA-binding protein 14 is a protein that in humans is encoded by the RBM14 gene.

== Interactions ==
RBM14 has been shown to interact with TARBP2.
