= Protein phosphatase 2A =

Protein phosphatase 2A may refer to:

- Protein phosphatase 2, an enzyme
- Myosin-light-chain phosphatase, an enzyme
