= TARBP2 =

Protein

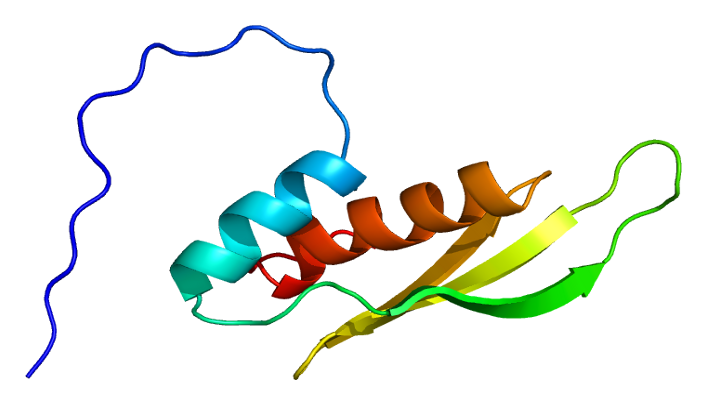

Identifiers
- Aliases: TARBP2, LOQS, TRBP, TRBP1, TRBP2, RISC loading complex RNA binding subunit, TARBP2 subunit of RISC loading complex
- External IDs: OMIM: 605053; MGI: 103027; GeneCards: TARBP2
Available structures
| PDB | Ortholog search: PDBe RCSB |
| PDB | List of PDB id codes 2CPN, 3ADL, 3LLH, 4WYQ |

Gene location (Human)
| Chr. | Chromosome 12 (human) |
| Band | 12q13.13 | Start | 53,500,921 bp |
| Band | 12q13.13 | End | 53,506,431 bp |

Gene location (Mouse)
| Chr. | Chromosome 15 (mouse) |
| Band | 15 F3|15 57.65 cM | Start | 102,426,627 bp |
| Band | 15 F3|15 57.65 cM | End | 102,432,111 bp |
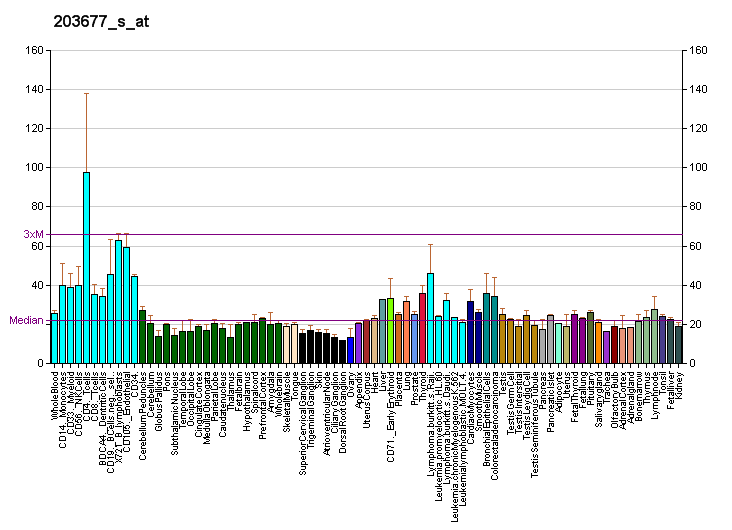
RNA expression pattern
| Bgee | Human / Mouse (ortholog); Top expressed in: right hemisphere of cerebellum; right uterine tube; right lobe of thyroid gland; right adrenal gland; right adrenal cortex; mucosa of transverse colon; granulocyte; left lobe of thyroid gland; right lobe of liver; body of pancreas / Top expressed in: spermatocyte; yolk sac; testicle; spermatid; epiblast; embryo; mesencephalon; neural tube; heart; embryo; More reference expression data |
| BioGPS | More reference expression data |
Gene ontology
| Molecular function | protein N-terminus binding; protein binding; siRNA binding; RNA binding; enzyme binding; pre-mRNA binding; double-stranded RNA binding; identical protein binding; protein homodimerization activity; pre-miRNA binding; miRNA binding |
| Cellular component | cytoplasm; cytosol; perinuclear region of cytoplasm; nucleus; nucleoplasm; nuclear body; RISC-loading complex; RISC complex |
| Biological process | regulation of viral transcription; negative regulation of protein kinase activity; multicellular organism growth; positive regulation of translation; single fertilization; negative regulation of defense response to virus by host; spermatid development; positive regulation of viral genome replication; regulation of translation; production of miRNAs involved in gene silencing by miRNA; miRNA metabolic process; gene silencing; production of siRNA involved in RNA interference; pre-miRNA processing; regulation of production of miRNAs involved in gene silencing by miRNA; skeletal muscle tissue regeneration; positive regulation of muscle cell differentiation; neural precursor cell proliferation |
Sources:Amigo / QuickGO
Orthologs
| Databases | NCBI: entry; OMA: entry |
| Species | Human | Mouse |
| Entrez | 6895 | 21357 |
| Ensembl | ENSG00000139546 | ENSMUSG00000023051 |
| UniProt | Q15633 | P97473 |
| RefSeq (mRNA) | NM_004178; NM_134323; NM_134324 | NM_001253795; NM_009319 |
| RefSeq (protein) | NP_004169; NP_599150; NP_599151 | NP_001240724; NP_033345 |
| Location (UCSC) | Chr 12: 53.5 – 53.51 Mb | Chr 15: 102.43 – 102.43 Mb |
| PubMed search |
- Wikidata
| View/Edit Human | View/Edit Mouse |

RISC-loading complex subunit TARBP2 is a protein that in humans is encoded by the TARBP2 gene.

== Function ==
HIV-1, the causative agent of acquired immunodeficiency syndrome (AIDS), contains an RNA genome that produces a chromosomally integrated DNA during the replicative cycle. Activation of HIV-1 gene expression by the transactivator Tat is dependent on an RNA regulatory element (TAR) located downstream of the transcription initiation site. The protein encoded by this gene binds between the bulge and the loop of the HIV-1 TAR RNA regulatory element and activates HIV-1 gene expression in synergy with the viral Tat protein. Alternative splicing results in multiple transcript variants encoding different isoforms. This gene also has a pseudogene.

== Interactions ==
TARBP2 has been shown to interact with Protein kinase R and RBM14.
