= PRKRA =

Protein-coding gene in the species Homo sapiens

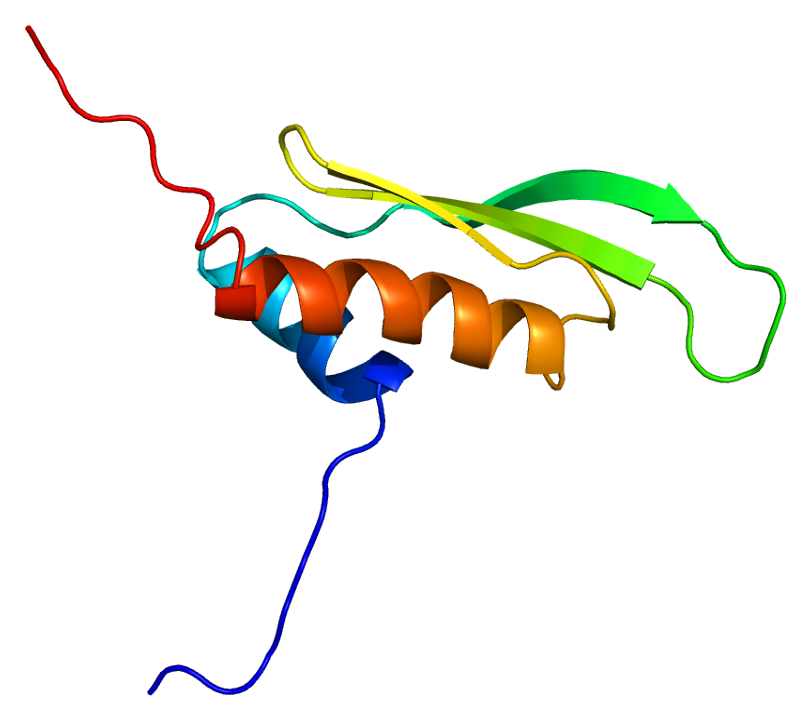
Available structures
| PDB | Ortholog search: PDBe RCSB |
| PDB | List of PDB id codes 2DIX |

Identifiers
- Aliases: PRKRA, DYT16, PACT, RAX, HSD14, protein activator of interferon induced protein kinase EIF2AK2
- External IDs: OMIM: 603424; MGI: 1344375; HomoloGene: 2738; GeneCards: PRKRA; OMA:PRKRA - orthologs

Gene location (Human)
| Chr. | Chromosome 2 (human) |
| Band | 2q31.2 | Start | 178,431,292 bp |
| Band | 2q31.2 | End | 178,451,512 bp |

Gene location (Mouse)
| Chr. | Chromosome 2 (mouse) |
| Band | 2|2 C3 | Start | 76,460,242 bp |
| Band | 2|2 C3 | End | 76,478,359 bp |
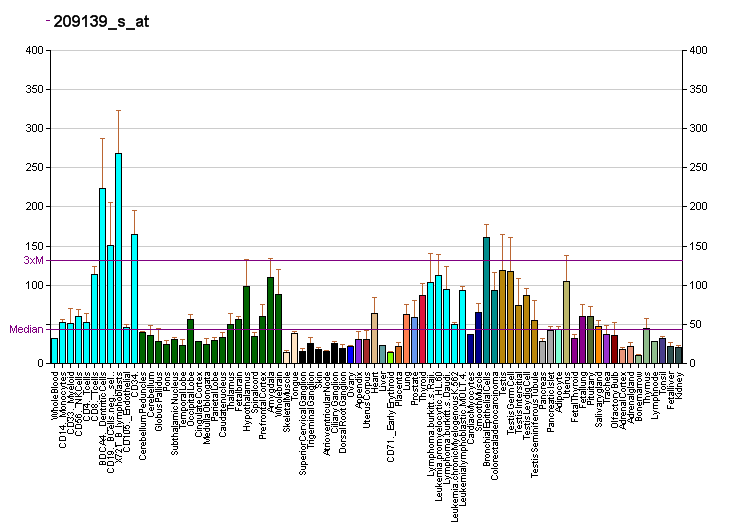
RNA expression pattern
| Bgee | Human / Mouse (ortholog); Top expressed in: sperm; Skeletal muscle tissue of biceps brachii; Skeletal muscle tissue of rectus abdominis; right ventricle; gastrocnemius muscle; muscle of thigh; thoracic diaphragm; tibial arteries; Descending thoracic aorta; ganglionic eminence / Top expressed in: interventricular septum; endocardial cushion; medullary collecting duct; fossa; renal corpuscle; medial ganglionic eminence; condyle; otic vesicle; atrioventricular valve; neural tube; More reference expression data |
| BioGPS | More reference expression data |
Gene ontology
| Molecular function | protein homodimerization activity; protein binding; identical protein binding; enzyme binding; double-stranded RNA binding; enzyme activator activity; RNA binding; pre-miRNA binding |
| Cellular component | cytoplasm; membrane; intracellular anatomical structure; nucleoplasm; perinuclear region of cytoplasm; cytosol; RISC-loading complex |
| Biological process | skeletal system morphogenesis; response to virus; outer ear morphogenesis; pre-miRNA processing; protein phosphorylation; immune response; middle ear morphogenesis; cellular response to oxidative stress; positive regulation of intrinsic apoptotic signaling pathway; negative regulation of cell population proliferation; production of miRNAs involved in gene silencing by miRNA; positive regulation of catalytic activity; protein stabilization; miRNA metabolic process; production of siRNA involved in RNA interference; gene silencing; viral process; ear development |
Sources:Amigo / QuickGO
Orthologs
| Species | Human | Mouse |
| Entrez | 8575 | 23992 |
| Ensembl | ENSG00000180228 | ENSMUSG00000002731 |
| UniProt | O75569 | Q9WTX2 |
| RefSeq (mRNA) | NM_001139517; NM_001139518; NM_001316362; NM_003690 | NM_011871 |
| RefSeq (protein) | NP_001132989; NP_001132990; NP_001303291; NP_003681 | NP_036001 |
| Location (UCSC) | Chr 2: 178.43 – 178.45 Mb | Chr 2: 76.46 – 76.48 Mb |
| PubMed search |
- Wikidata
| View/Edit Human | View/Edit Mouse |

Protein kinase, interferon-inducible double stranded RNA dependent activator, also known as interferon-inducible double stranded RNA-dependent protein kinase activator X(RAX) or Protein ACTivator of the interferon-induced protein kinase (PACT) is a protein that in humans is encoded by the PRKRA gene. PACT heterodimerizes with and activates protein kinase R. PRKRA mutations have been linked to a rare form of dystonia parkinsonism.
