= PPP2R5C =

Protein-coding gene in the species Homo sapiens

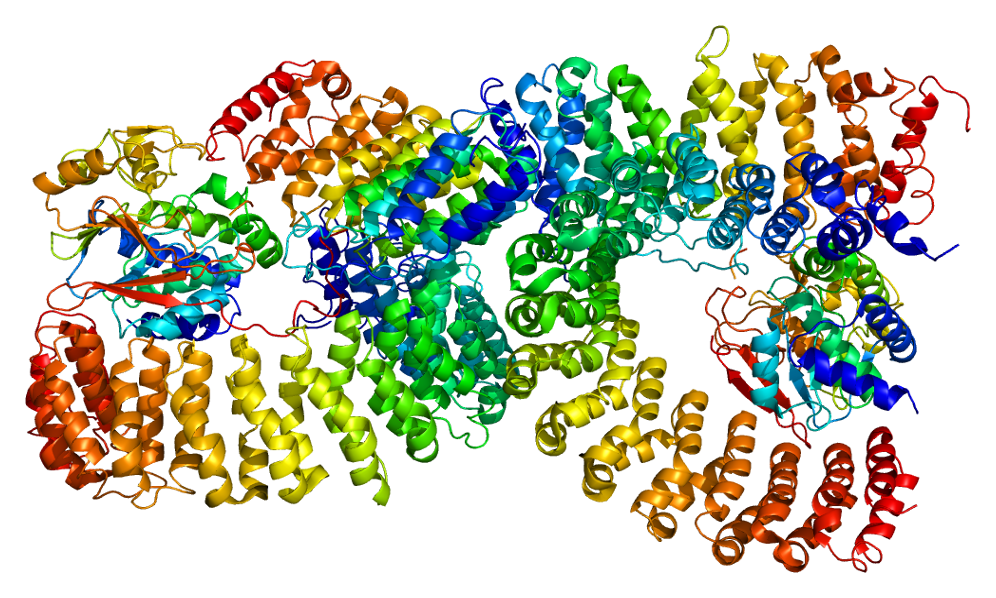

Identifiers
- Aliases: PPP2R5C, B56G, PR61G, protein phosphatase 2 regulatory subunit B'gamma, B56gamma
- External IDs: OMIM: 601645; MGI: 1349475; GeneCards: PPP2R5C
Available structures
PDB	Ortholog search: PDBe RCSB
PDB	List of PDB id codes 2IAE, 2JAK, 2NPP, 2NYL, 2NYM, 3FGA, 5JJA

Gene location (Human)
Chr.	Chromosome 14 (human)
Band	14q32.31	Start	101,761,798 bp
Band	14q32.31	End	101,927,989 bp

Gene location (Mouse)
Chr.	Chromosome 12 (mouse)
Band	12 F1|12 60.56 cM	Start	110,413,554 bp
Band	12 F1|12 60.56 cM	End	110,549,496 bp
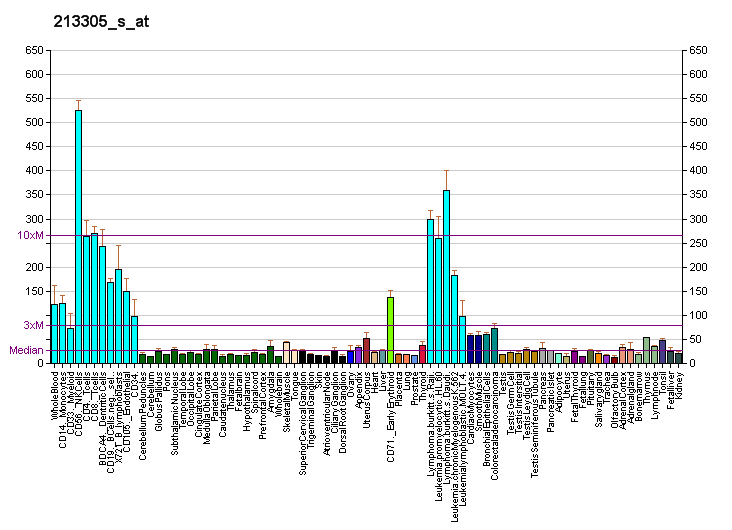

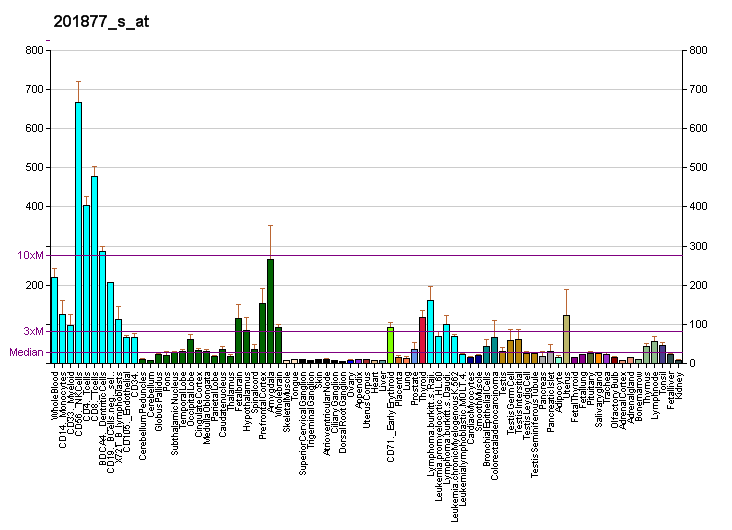
RNA expression pattern
Bgee	Human / Mouse (ortholog); Top expressed in: sperm; endothelial cell; epithelium of colon; granulocyte; Achilles tendon; Brodmann area 23; tonsil; C1 segment; rectum; ventricular zone / Top expressed in: neural layer of retina; atrioventricular valve; primary visual cortex; spermatid; superior frontal gyrus; primary motor cortex; spermatocyte; cingulate gyrus; seminiferous tubule; medial dorsal nucleus; More reference expression data
BioGPS	More reference expression data
Gene ontology
Molecular function	protein binding; protein phosphatase regulator activity; protein phosphatase activator activity
Cellular component	protein phosphatase type 2A complex; chromosome, centromeric region; nucleus; chromosome; nucleoplasm; Golgi apparatus; cytosol
Biological process	intrinsic apoptotic signaling pathway in response to DNA damage by p53 class mediator; DNA damage response, signal transduction by p53 class mediator resulting in cell cycle arrest; signal transduction; negative regulation of cell population proliferation; proteasome-mediated ubiquitin-dependent protein catabolic process; regulation of phosphatidylinositol 3-kinase signaling; regulation of phosphoprotein phosphatase activity; regulation of protein autophosphorylation; protein dephosphorylation; negative regulation of protein kinase B signaling
Sources:Amigo / QuickGO
Orthologs
Databases	NCBI: entry; OMA: entry
Species	Human	Mouse
Entrez	5527	26931
Ensembl	ENSG00000078304	ENSMUSG00000017843
UniProt	Q13362	Q60996
RefSeq (mRNA)	NM_001161725; NM_001161726; NM_002719; NM_178586; NM_178587 NM_178588; NM_001352912; NM_001352913; NM_001352914; NM_001352915; NM_001352916	NM_001037934; NM_001081457; NM_001081458; NM_001135001; NM_012023 NM_001364204; NM_001364205; NM_001364206; NM_001364207; NM_001364208; NM_001364209; NM_001364210; NM_001364211; NM_001364212; NM_001364213; NM_001364214; NM_001373949; NM_001373950; NM_001373951; NM_001373952; NM_001373953; NM_001373954
RefSeq (protein)	NP_001155197; NP_001155198; NP_002710; NP_848701; NP_848702 NP_001339841; NP_001339842; NP_001339843; NP_001339844; NP_001339845	NP_001074926; NP_001074927; NP_001128473; NP_036153; NP_001351133 NP_001351134; NP_001351135; NP_001351136; NP_001351137; NP_001351138; NP_001351139; NP_001351140; NP_001351141; NP_001351142; NP_001351143; NP_001360878; NP_001360879; NP_001360880; NP_001360881; NP_001360882; NP_001360883
Location (UCSC)	Chr 14: 101.76 – 101.93 Mb	Chr 12: 110.41 – 110.55 Mb
PubMed search
- Wikidata
View/Edit Human	View/Edit Mouse

Serine/threonine-protein phosphatase 2A 56 kDa regulatory subunit gamma isoform is an enzyme that in humans is encoded by the PPP2R5C gene.

== Function ==
The product of this gene belongs to the Protein phosphatase 2A regulatory subunit B family. Protein phosphatase 2A is one of the four major Ser/Thr phosphatases, and it is implicated in the negative control of cell growth and division. It consists of a common heteromeric core enzyme, which is composed of a catalytic subunit and a constant regulatory subunit, that associates with a variety of regulatory subunits. The B regulatory subunit might modulate substrate selectivity and catalytic activity. This gene encodes a gamma isoform of the regulatory subunit B56 subfamily. Alternatively spliced transcript variants encoding different isoforms have been identified.

== Interactions ==
PPP2R5C has been shown to interact with PPP2R1B, PPP2CA and PPP2R5A.
