= EIF2AK3 =

Human protein and coding gene

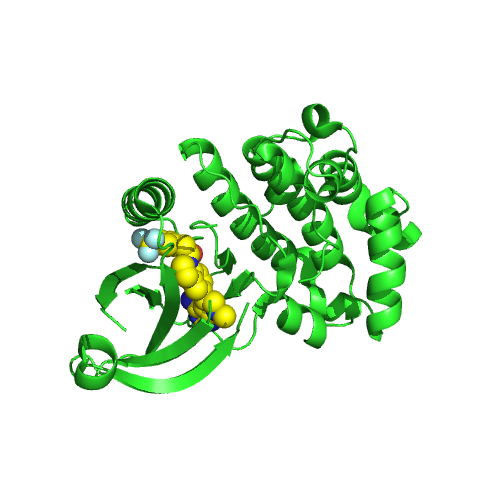

Identifiers
- Aliases: EIF2AK3, PEK, PERK, WRS, eukaryotic translation initiation factor 2 alpha kinase 3
- External IDs: OMIM: 604032; MGI: 1341830; GeneCards: EIF2AK3
Available structures
PDB	Ortholog search: PDBe RCSB
PDB	List of PDB id codes 4G31, 4G34, 4M7I, 4X7H, 4X7J, 4X7K, 4X7L, 4X7N, 4X7O, 4YZS
Enzyme activity
EC #	BRENDA	ExPASy	KEGG	MetaCyc
2.7.10.2	↗	↗	↗	↗
2.7.11.1	↗	↗	↗	↗

Gene location (Human)
Chr.	Chromosome 2 (human)
Band	2p11.2	Start	88,556,741 bp
Band	2p11.2	End	88,691,518 bp

Gene location (Mouse)
Chr.	Chromosome 6 (mouse)
Band	6|6 C1	Start	70,821,499 bp
Band	6|6 C1	End	70,882,229 bp
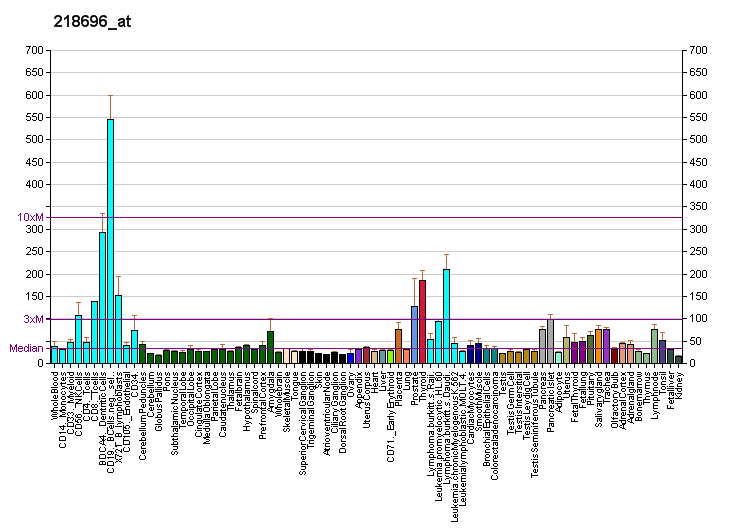
RNA expression pattern
Bgee	Human / Mouse (ortholog); Top expressed in: body of pancreas; mucosa of paranasal sinus; Achilles tendon; pylorus; parotid gland; nasal epithelium; mucosa of sigmoid colon; tibia; epithelium of nasopharynx; trachea / Top expressed in: submandibular gland; lacrimal gland; parotid gland; granulocyte; seminal vesicula; calvaria; islet of Langerhans; lumbar spinal ganglion; epithelium of stomach; decidua; More reference expression data
BioGPS	More reference expression data
Gene ontology
Molecular function	transferase activity; protein kinase activity; Hsp90 protein binding; nucleotide binding; protein homodimerization activity; kinase activity; protein serine/threonine kinase activity; protein binding; identical protein binding; enzyme binding; protein phosphatase binding; ATP binding; eukaryotic translation initiation factor 2alpha kinase activity
Cellular component	cytoplasm; integral component of membrane; endoplasmic reticulum membrane; membrane; integral component of endoplasmic reticulum membrane; endoplasmic reticulum; perinuclear region of cytoplasm; cytosolic ribosome
Biological process	skeletal system development; bone mineralization; insulin-like growth factor receptor signaling pathway; negative regulation of translation; regulation of endoplasmic reticulum stress-induced eIF2 alpha phosphorylation; cellular response to glucose starvation; negative regulation of translation in response to stress; ossification; negative regulation of translational initiation in response to stress; phosphorylation; cellular response to amino acid starvation; chondrocyte development; regulation of endoplasmic reticulum stress-induced intrinsic apoptotic signaling pathway; insulin secretion; endoplasmic reticulum organization; response to endoplasmic reticulum stress; PERK-mediated unfolded protein response; ER overload response; response to manganese-induced endoplasmic reticulum stress; endoplasmic reticulum unfolded protein response; protein phosphorylation; response to unfolded protein; positive regulation of gene expression; cellular response to cold; peptidyl-serine phosphorylation; angiogenesis; eiF2alpha phosphorylation in response to endoplasmic reticulum stress; protein autophosphorylation; positive regulation of vascular endothelial growth factor production; positive regulation of transcription by RNA polymerase I; protein homooligomerization; activation of cysteine-type endopeptidase activity involved in apoptotic process; negative regulation of myelination; regulation of translation; calcium-mediated signaling; endocrine pancreas development; positive regulation of protein localization to nucleus; regulation of translational initiation by eIF2 alpha phosphorylation
Sources:Amigo / QuickGO
Orthologs
Databases	NCBI: entry; OMA: entry
Species	Human	Mouse
Entrez	9451	13666
Ensembl	ENSG00000172071	ENSMUSG00000031668
UniProt	Q9NZJ5	Q9Z2B5
RefSeq (mRNA)	NM_001313915; NM_004836	NM_010121; NM_001313918
RefSeq (protein)	NP_001300844; NP_004827	NP_001300847; NP_034251
Location (UCSC)	Chr 2: 88.56 – 88.69 Mb	Chr 6: 70.82 – 70.88 Mb
PubMed search
- Wikidata
View/Edit Human	View/Edit Mouse

Eukaryotic translation initiation factor 2-alpha kinase 3, also known as protein kinase R (PKR)-like endoplasmic reticulum kinase (PERK), is an enzyme that in humans is encoded by the EIF2AK3 gene.

== Function ==
The protein encoded by this gene phosphorylates the alpha subunit of eukaryotic translation-initiation factor 2 (EIF2), leading to its inactivation, and thus to a rapid reduction of translational initiation and repression of global protein synthesis. It is a type I membrane protein located in the endoplasmic reticulum (ER), where it is induced by ER stress caused by malfolded proteins. PERK also has other phosphorylation substrates and has functions in regulating mitochondrial homeostasis that are independent of its kinase activity. Because of this functional complexity, the biochemical mechanisms underlying the diverse defects observed in PERK-deficient humans and mice remain unclear.

== Clinical significance ==
PERK (EIF2AK3) deficiency in humans and mice denoted as the Wolcott–Rallison syndrome (WRS) display a complex array of abnormalities including permanent neonatal diabetes, exocrine pancreas necrosis, postnatal growth retardation, osteopenia, skeletal dysplasia, acute liver failure, and death during infancy.

== Animal studies ==
Based on cell culture experiments using PERK-deficient fibroblast that preceded, the initial studies of PERK-deficient mice proposed that these anomalies were all due to a dysfunction in regulating the ER stress/Unfolded protein response and uncontrolled global protein synthesis, and specifically that permanent neonatal diabetes resulted from uncontrolled ER stress and apoptotic loss of pancreatic β cells. Subsequent genetic studies utilizing tissue-specific PERK KO and tissue-targeted transgenic knockin mice did not support this explanation for the development of diabetes in PERK-deficient mice. Analysis of mice with β-cell-specific PERK deficiency found that reduced β-cell mass resulted primarily from impaired β-cell proliferation and differentiation during fetal and neonatal development rather than cell death and apoptosis. Additional studies showed that PERK-deficient β cells exhibit defects in proinsulin trafficking and secretory-pathway quality control that are not explained by uncontrolled global protein synthesis. PERK has also been shown to regulate intracellular calcium dynamics and insulin secretion in β cells under physiological conditions, which is independent of phosphorylation of eIF2α. Studies in PERK-deficient mice have also demonstrated that major systemic consequences of PERK deficiency can be non-cell-autonomous. Restoration of PERK expression exclusively in pancreatic β cells prevented diabetes, acute liver failure, and premature death in otherwise PERK-deficient mice, demonstrating that β-cell PERK function is sufficient to prevent the lethal systemic phenotype. These findings show that acute liver failure in PERK-deficient mice, which is the proximate cause of death in humans and mice, is not an obligate cell-autonomous consequence of PERK deficiency in the liver, but can arise secondarily from loss of PERK-dependent pancreatic endocrine function. By contrast, the postnatal necrosis of the exocrine pancreas was shown to be a cell autonomous defect to the acinar cells of the exocrine pancreas. In addition, PERK expression exclusively in pancreatic β cells resulted in restoration of liver-derived IGF-1, catch-up growth, and normalization of bone density. The mechanism by which restoration of PERK function in β cells prevents acute liver failure remains unresolved. However, the findings demonstrate that the physiological consequences of PERK deficiency in a whole organism cannot be inferred from its molecular role in the ER stress response demonstrated in PERK-deficient cultured fibroblasts or solely from cell-autonomous effects observed in individual tissues. The major function of PERK in whole organisms is to regulate insulin synthesis, trafficking, and secretion in pancreatic beta cells for the purpose of maintaining glucose homeostasis and to modulate metabolic homeostasis and growth functions of the liver.

== Clinical significance ==
Patients with mutations in this gene develop Wolcott-Rallison syndrome.

== Interactions ==
EIF2AK3 has been shown to interact with DNAJC3, NFE2L2, and endoplasmic reticulum chaperone BiP (Hsp70).

== Inhibitors ==
- GSK2606414
- 3-Fluoro-GSK2606414
