= TLX1 =

Protein coding gene in Humans

Identifiers
- Aliases: TLX1, HOX11, TCL3, T-cell leukemia homeobox 1, T cell leukemia homeobox 1
- External IDs: OMIM: 186770; MGI: 98769; GeneCards: TLX1

Gene location (Human)
| Chr. | Chromosome 10 (human) |
| Band | 10q24.31 | Start | 101,131,300 bp |
| Band | 10q24.31 | End | 101,137,789 bp |

Gene location (Mouse)
| Chr. | Chromosome 19 (mouse) |
| Band | 19 C3|19 38.45 cM | Start | 45,139,119 bp |
| Band | 19 C3|19 38.45 cM | End | 45,145,382 bp |
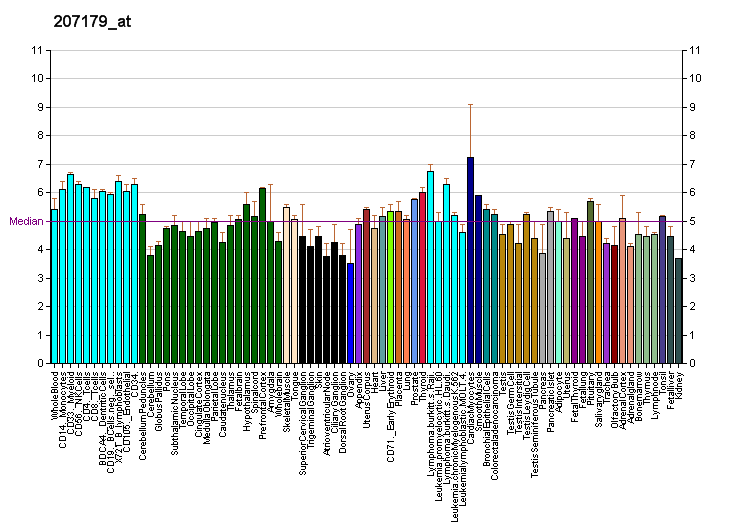
RNA expression pattern
| Bgee | Human / Mouse (ortholog); Top expressed in: spleen; testicle; minor salivary glands; gonad; right lobe of liver; mucosa of transverse colon; duodenum; tonsil; ventricle of the heart; left ventricle / Top expressed in: dorsal mesentery; tongue; middle ear; submandibular gland; outer ear; auricle; skin of external ear; female urethra; male urethra; Eustachian tube; More reference expression data |
| BioGPS | More reference expression data |
Gene ontology
| Molecular function | RNA polymerase II cis-regulatory region sequence-specific DNA binding; DNA binding; sequence-specific DNA binding; DNA-binding transcription activator activity, RNA polymerase II-specific; protein binding; DNA-binding transcription factor activity, RNA polymerase II-specific; DNA-binding transcription factor activity |
| Cellular component | nucleus |
| Biological process | multicellular organism development; regulation of transcription, DNA-templated; transcription by RNA polymerase II; positive regulation of transcription by RNA polymerase II; regulation of transcription by RNA polymerase II |
Sources:Amigo / QuickGO
Orthologs
| Databases | NCBI: entry; OMA: entry |
| Species | Human | Mouse |
| Entrez | 3195 | 21908 |
| Ensembl | ENSG00000107807 | ENSMUSG00000025215 |
| UniProt | P31314 | P43345 |
| RefSeq (mRNA) | NM_001195517; NM_005521 | NM_021901 |
| RefSeq (protein) | NP_001182446; NP_005512 | n/a |
| Location (UCSC) | Chr 10: 101.13 – 101.14 Mb | Chr 19: 45.14 – 45.15 Mb |
| PubMed search |
- Wikidata
| View/Edit Human | View/Edit Mouse |

T-cell leukemia homeobox protein 1 is a protein that in humans is encoded by the TLX1 gene, which was initially named HOX11. As a transcription factor, TLX1 is involved in regulating which genes are transcribed, and therefore which proteins are produced by cells. In particular, it appears to be necessary for embryonic spleen development, since mice without a functional copy of the gene are born without a spleen. Chromosomal translocations of this gene can cause abnormal activation, and lead to T-cell leukemia, which is where the first part of the name comes from, while homeobox refers to the family of transcription factors it belongs to.

== Interactions ==
TLX1 has been shown to interact with PPP1CC, PPP2CB and PPP2CA.
