= GSK2606414 =

Chemical compound

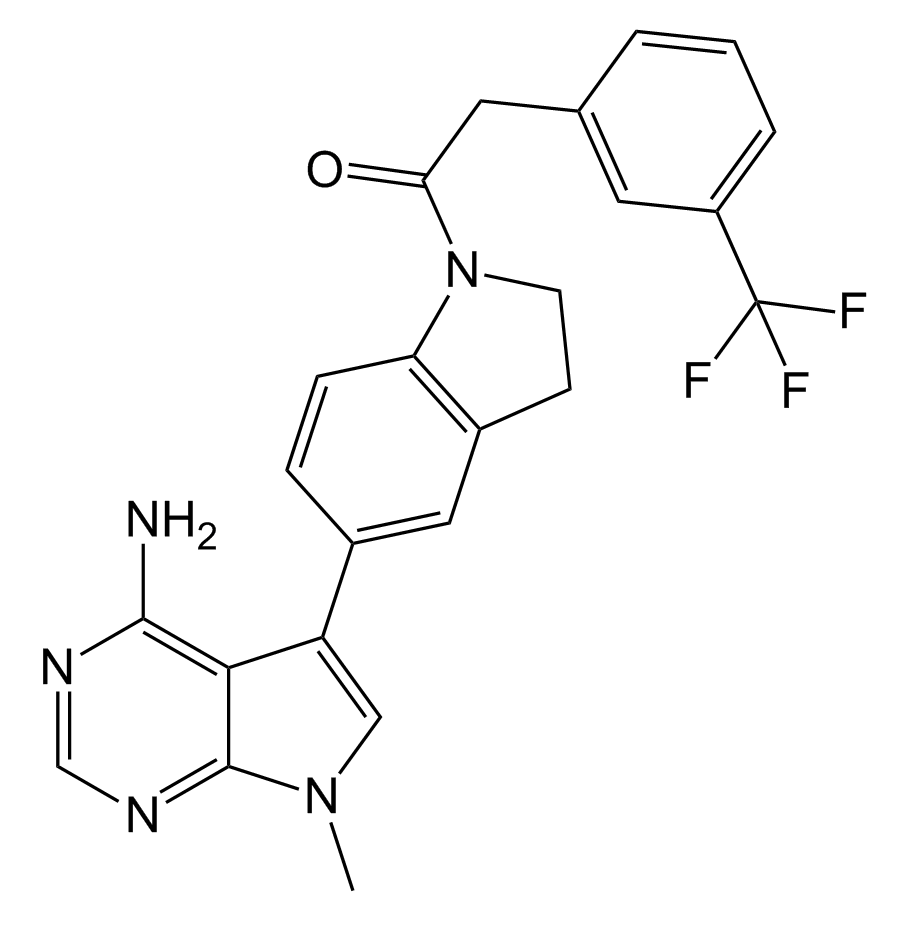

Identifiers
- IUPAC name: 1-[5-(4-Amino-7-methyl-7H-pyrrolo[2,3-d]pyrimidin-5-yl)indolin-1-yl]-2-(3-trifluoromethylphenyl)ethanone
- CAS Number: 1337531-36-8
- PubChem CID: 53469448
- ChemSpider: 28643060
- UNII: DPP2K6EFW8
- PDB ligand: 0WH (PDBe, RCSB PDB)

Chemical and physical data
- Formula: C_{24}H_{20}F_{3}N_{5}O
- Molar mass: 451.453 g·mol^{−1}
- 3D model (JSmol): Interactive image
- SMILES: CN1C2=NC=NC(N)=C2C(C3=CC(CCN4C(CC5=CC(C(F)(F)F)=CC=C5)=O)=C4C=C3)=C1
- InChI: InChI=1S/C24H20F3N5O/c1-31-12-18(21-22(28)29-13-30-23(21)31)15-5-6-19-16(11-15)7-8-32(19)20(33)10-14-3-2-4-17(9-14)24(25,26)27/h2-6,9,11-13H,7-8,10H2,1H3,(H2,28,29,30); Key:SIXVRXARNAVBTC-UHFFFAOYSA-N

GSK2606414 is a drug which is the first selective inhibitor discovered for the enzyme protein kinase R (PKR)-like endoplasmic reticulum kinase (PERK), which is involved in various processes relating to cancer and neurodegenerative disorders. GSK2606414 was found to be a potent and selective inhibitor of PERK, with good oral bioavailability and blood-brain barrier penetration. PERK mediates the unfolded protein response pathway which is involved in the initiation of protein synthesis, and this pathway has been implicated in the neurotoxicity of various diseases including prion and Alzheimer's diseases. Treatment with GSK2606414 was found to be neuroprotective in mice against damage caused by prions, and prevented the development of cognitive deficits and other clinical manifestations of prion disease. Extension of lifespan in treated mice was, however, not recorded. However, side effects such as weight loss and elevated blood glucose levels were also observed, likely due to unwanted inhibition of PERK in the pancreas gland, where it is involved in regulating insulin production.
