= DNAJC3 =

Human protein and coding gene

Identifiers
- Aliases: DNAJC3, ERdj6, HP58, P58, P58IPK, PRKRI, ACPHD, DnaJ heat shock protein family (Hsp40) member C3, p58(IPK)
- External IDs: OMIM: 601184; MGI: 107373; GeneCards: DNAJC3
Available structures
PDB	Ortholog search: PDBe RCSB
PDB	List of PDB id codes 2Y4T, 2Y4U

Gene location (Human)
Chr.	Chromosome 13 (human)
Band	13q32.1	Start	95,677,139 bp
Band	13q32.1	End	95,794,988 bp

Gene location (Mouse)
Chr.	Chromosome 14 (mouse)
Band	14|14 E4	Start	119,175,388 bp
Band	14|14 E4	End	119,219,109 bp
RNA expression pattern
Bgee	Human / Mouse (ortholog); Top expressed in: corpus epididymis; caput epididymis; oocyte; epithelium of nasopharynx; pericardium; tail of epididymis; secondary oocyte; decidua; pylorus; palpebral conjunctiva / Top expressed in: lacrimal gland; salivary gland; parotid gland; gastrula; submandibular gland; seminal vesicula; secondary oocyte; decidua; renal corpuscle; left lobe of liver; More reference expression data
BioGPS	n/a
Gene ontology
Molecular function	chaperone binding; misfolded protein binding; protein kinase binding; protein kinase inhibitor activity; unfolded protein binding
Cellular component	cytoplasm; extracellular vesicle; endoplasmic reticulum lumen; membrane; smooth endoplasmic reticulum; endoplasmic reticulum Sec complex; extracellular exosome; endoplasmic reticulum; cytosol; extracellular region; azurophil granule lumen
Biological process	negative regulation of apoptotic process; response to unfolded protein; IRE1-mediated unfolded protein response; defense response to virus; proteolysis involved in cellular protein catabolic process; regulation of translation; cellular response to cold; negative regulation of endoplasmic reticulum stress-induced eIF2 alpha phosphorylation; positive regulation of translation initiation in response to endoplasmic reticulum stress; negative regulation of protein kinase activity; neutrophil degranulation; post-translational protein modification; protein folding in endoplasmic reticulum; response to endoplasmic reticulum stress
Sources:Amigo / QuickGO
Orthologs
Databases	NCBI: entry; OMA: entry
Species	Human	Mouse
Entrez	5611	100037258
Ensembl	ENSG00000102580	ENSMUSG00000022136
UniProt	Q13217	Q91YW3
RefSeq (mRNA)	NM_006260	NM_008929
RefSeq (protein)	NP_006251	NP_032955
Location (UCSC)	Chr 13: 95.68 – 95.79 Mb	Chr 14: 119.18 – 119.22 Mb
PubMed search
- Wikidata
View/Edit Human	View/Edit Mouse

DnaJ homolog subfamily C member 3 is a protein that in humans is encoded by the DNAJC3 gene.

== Function ==
The protein encoded by this gene contains multiple tetratricopeptide repeat (TPR) motifs as well as the highly conserved J domain found in DNAJ chaperone family members. It is a member of the tetratricopeptide repeat family of proteins and acts as an inhibitor of the interferon-induced, dsRNA-activated protein kinase (PKR).

== Clinical significance ==
An important role for DNAJC3 has been attributed to diabetes mellitus as well as multi system neurodegeneration. Diabetes mellitus and neurodegeneration are common diseases for which shared genetic factors are still only partly known. It was shown that loss of the BiP (immunoglobulin heavy-chain binding protein) co-chaperone DNAJC3 leads to diabetes mellitus and widespread neurodegeneration. Accordingly, three siblings were investigated with juvenile-onset diabetes and central and peripheral neurodegeneration, including ataxia, upper-motor-neuron damage, peripheral neuropathy, hearing loss, and cerebral atrophy. Subsequently, exome sequencing identified a homozygous stop mutation in DNAJC3. Further screening of a diabetes database with 226,194 individuals yielded eight phenotypically similar individuals and one family carrying a homozygous DNAJC3 deletion. DNAJC3 was absent in fibroblasts from all affected subjects in both families. To delineate the phenotypic and mutational spectrum and the genetic variability of DNAJC3, 8,603 exomes were further analyzed, including 506 from families affected by diabetes, ataxia, upper-motor-neuron damage, peripheral neuropathy, or hearing loss. This analysis revealed only one further loss-of-function allele in DNAJC3 and no further associations in subjects with only a subset of the features of the main phenotype. Notably, the DNAJC3 protein is also considered as an important marker for stress in the endoplasmatic reticulum.

== Interactions ==
DNAJC3 has been shown to interact with:

- EIF2AK2,
- EIF2AK3, and
- PRKRIR.
