= PPP2R2D =

Protein-coding gene in the species Homo sapiens

Identifiers
- Aliases: PPP2R2D, MDS026, protein phosphatase 2 regulatory subunit Bdelta, B55delta, B55D
- External IDs: OMIM: 613992; MGI: 1289252; GeneCards: PPP2R2D

Gene location (Human)
Chr.	Chromosome 10 (human)
Band	10q26.3	Start	131,901,008 bp
Band	10q26.3	End	131,959,834 bp

Gene location (Mouse)
Chr.	Chromosome 7 (mouse)
Band	7 F4|7 82.95 cM	Start	138,846,079 bp
Band	7 F4|7 82.95 cM	End	138,883,057 bp
RNA expression pattern
Bgee	Human / Mouse (ortholog); Top expressed in: body of pancreas; left ovary; muscle of thigh; cerebellar hemisphere; right adrenal cortex; right hemisphere of cerebellum; left adrenal gland; ganglionic eminence; primary visual cortex; left adrenal cortex / Top expressed in: internal carotid artery; facial motor nucleus; external carotid artery; seminiferous tubule; primitive streak; endothelial cell of lymphatic vessel; right ventricle; spermatid; brown adipose tissue; motor neuron; More reference expression data
BioGPS	n/a
Gene ontology
Molecular function	protein serine/threonine phosphatase activity; protein binding; protein phosphatase regulator activity
Cellular component	cytoplasm; protein phosphatase type 2A complex; cytosol
Biological process	cell division; cell cycle; exit from mitosis; peptidyl-serine dephosphorylation; mitotic cell cycle; developmental process; regulation of phosphoprotein phosphatase activity
Sources:Amigo / QuickGO
Orthologs
Databases	NCBI: entry; OMA: entry
Species	Human	Mouse
Entrez	55844	52432
Ensembl	ENSG00000175470	ENSMUSG00000041769
UniProt	Q66LE6	Q925E7
RefSeq (mRNA)	NM_001003656; NM_001291310; NM_018461	NM_026391; NM_001347618
RefSeq (protein)	NP_001278239; NP_060931	NP_001334547; NP_080667
Location (UCSC)	Chr 10: 131.9 – 131.96 Mb	Chr 7: 138.85 – 138.88 Mb
PubMed search
- Wikidata
View/Edit Human	View/Edit Mouse

PP2A subunit B isoform delta also known as serine/threonine-protein phosphatase 2A 55 kDa regulatory subunit B delta isoform is a protein that in humans is encoded by the PPP2R2D gene. It is a regulatory subunit of the heterotrimeric protein phosphatase 2 enzyme.
