= (Phosphatase 2A protein)-leucine-carboxy methyltransferase =

Class of enzymes

(phosphatase 2A protein)-leucine-carboxy methyltransferase

Identifiers
- EC no.: 2.1.1.233

Databases
- BRENDA: enzyme data
- ExPASy: NiceZyme view
- KEGG: enzyme entry
- MetaCyc: metabolic pathway
- Rhea: reactions
- PDB structures: RCSB PDB PDBe PDBsum
Search
- PMC: articles
- PubMed: articles
- NCBI: proteins

(phosphatase 2A protein)-leucine-carboxy methyltransferase (EC 2.1.1.233) is an enzyme with systematic name S-adenosyl-L-methionine:(phosphatase 2A protein)-leucine O-methyltransferase. This enzyme catalyses the following chemical reaction

S-adenosyl-L-methionine + [phosphatase 2A protein]-leucine $\rightleftharpoons$ S-adenosyl-L-homocysteine + [phosphatase 2A protein]-leucine methyl ester

Methylates the C-terminal leucine of phosphatase 2A.
