= THAP12 =

Protein-coding gene in humans

Identifiers
- Aliases: THAP12, DAP4, P52rIPK, THAP0, PRKRIR, THAP domain containing 12
- External IDs: OMIM: 607374; MGI: 1920231; GeneCards: THAP12

Gene location (Mouse)
Chr.	Chromosome 7 (mouse)
Band	7|7 E1	Start	98,352,310 bp
Band	7|7 E1	End	98,367,269 bp
RNA expression pattern
Bgee	Human / Mouse (ortholog); Top expressed in: Achilles tendon; corpus epididymis; trabecular bone; caput epididymis; retinal pigment epithelium; secondary oocyte; ganglionic eminence; body of pancreas; lactiferous duct; superficial temporal artery / Top expressed in: triceps brachii muscle; temporal muscle; sternocleidomastoid muscle; vastus lateralis muscle; gastrocnemius muscle; muscle of thigh; digastric muscle; medial head of gastrocnemius muscle; intercostal muscle; ankle; More reference expression data
BioGPS	n/a
Gene ontology
Molecular function	metal ion binding; nucleic acid binding; protein dimerization activity; protein binding; DNA binding; DNA-binding transcription factor activity, RNA polymerase II-specific
Cellular component	nucleus; nucleoplasm; cytoplasm
Biological process	negative regulation of cell population proliferation; signal transduction; regulation of transcription by RNA polymerase II
Sources:Amigo / QuickGO
Orthologs
Databases	NCBI: entry
Species	Human	Mouse
Entrez	5612	72981
Ensembl	n/a	ENSMUSG00000030753
UniProt	O43422	Q9CUX1
RefSeq (mRNA)	NM_004705	NM_028410; NM_001355114
RefSeq (protein)	NP_004696	NP_082686; NP_001342043
Location (UCSC)	n/a	Chr 7: 98.35 – 98.37 Mb
PubMed search
- Wikidata
View/Edit Human	View/Edit Mouse

52 kDa repressor of the inhibitor of the protein kinase is an enzyme that in humans is encoded by the THAP12 gene (previously PRKRIR).

== Interactions ==
THAP12 has been shown to interact with STK4 and DNAJC3.
