= CCNG1 =

Protein-coding gene in humans

Identifiers
- Aliases: CCNG1, cyclin G1, CCNG
- External IDs: OMIM: 601578; MGI: 102890; HomoloGene: 2995; GeneCards: CCNG1; OMA:CCNG1 - orthologs

Gene location (Human)
Chr.	Chromosome 5 (human)
Band	5q34	Start	163,437,569 bp
Band	5q34	End	163,446,151 bp

Gene location (Mouse)
Chr.	Chromosome 11 (mouse)
Band	11|11 A5	Start	40,639,379 bp
Band	11|11 A5	End	40,646,138 bp
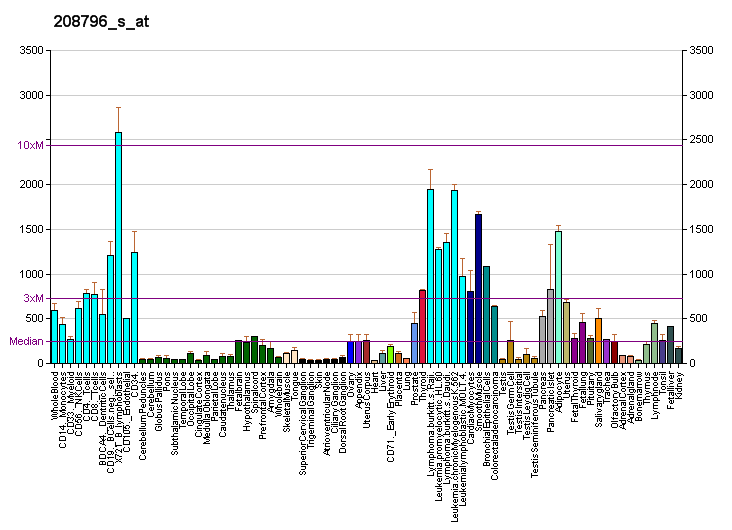
RNA expression pattern
Bgee	Human / Mouse (ortholog); Top expressed in: jejunal mucosa; biceps brachii; corpus epididymis; Skeletal muscle tissue of biceps brachii; kidney tubule; caput epididymis; thoracic diaphragm; parotid gland; germinal epithelium; duodenum / Top expressed in: intercostal muscle; vastus lateralis muscle; triceps brachii muscle; sternocleidomastoid muscle; temporal muscle; endothelial cell of lymphatic vessel; myocardium of ventricle; digastric muscle; masseter muscle; Epithelium of choroid plexus; More reference expression data
BioGPS	More reference expression data
Gene ontology
Molecular function	protein binding; protein kinase activity; cyclin-dependent protein serine/threonine kinase regulator activity; protein kinase binding
Cellular component	nucleus; nucleoplasm; cyclin-dependent protein kinase holoenzyme complex; cytoplasm
Biological process	cell cycle; regulation of cyclin-dependent protein serine/threonine kinase activity; regulation of cell cycle; cell division; mitotic cell cycle; protein phosphorylation; regulation of mitotic nuclear division; positive regulation of cell population proliferation; positive regulation of cell cycle; mitotic cell cycle phase transition
Sources:Amigo / QuickGO
Orthologs
Species	Human	Mouse
Entrez	900	12450
Ensembl	ENSG00000113328	ENSMUSG00000020326
UniProt	P51959	P51945
RefSeq (mRNA)	NM_004060; NM_199246	NM_009831
RefSeq (protein)	NP_004051; NP_954854; NP_001350944; NP_001350947; NP_001350948 NP_001350949; NP_001350950; NP_001350951; NP_001350952	NP_033961
Location (UCSC)	Chr 5: 163.44 – 163.45 Mb	Chr 11: 40.64 – 40.65 Mb
PubMed search
- Wikidata
View/Edit Human	View/Edit Mouse

Cyclin-G1 is a protein that in humans is encoded by the CCNG1 gene.

== Function ==
The eukaryotic cell cycle is governed by cyclin-dependent protein kinases (CDKs) whose activities are regulated by cyclins and CDK inhibitors. The protein encoded by this gene is a member of the cyclin family and contains the cyclin box. The encoded protein lacks the protein destabilizing (PEST) sequence that is present in other family members. Transcriptional activation of this gene can be induced by tumor protein p53. Two transcript variants encoding the same protein have been identified for this gene.

== Interactions ==
CCNG1 has been shown to interact with:

- Mdm2,
- P16,
- P53, and
- PPP2R4.
