= PPP2R4 =

Protein-coding gene in the species Homo sapiens

PTPA
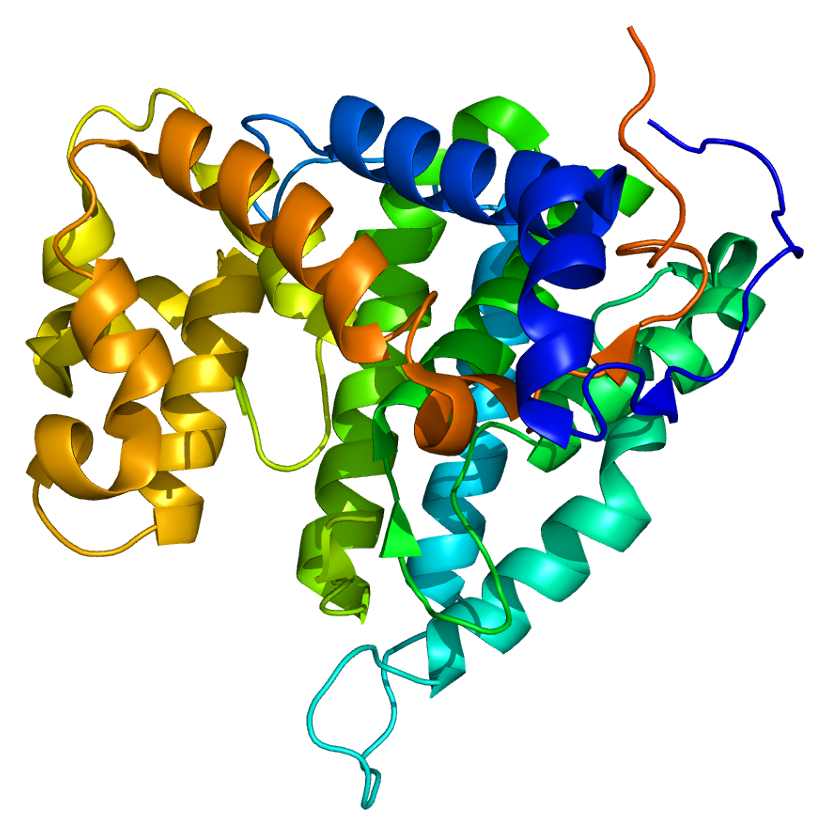

Identifiers
- Aliases: PTPA, PP2A, PR53, PPP2R4, protein phosphatase 2 regulatory subunit 4, protein phosphatase 2 phosphatase activator
- External IDs: OMIM: 600756; MGI: 1346006; GeneCards: PTPA
Available structures
PDB	Ortholog search: PDBe RCSB
PDB	List of PDB id codes 2G62, 2HV6, 2HV7, 2IXM, 4LAC, 4NY3
Enzyme activity
EC #	BRENDA	ExPASy	KEGG	MetaCyc
5.2.1.8	↗	↗	↗	↗

Gene location (Human)
Chr.	Chromosome 9 (human)
Band	9q34.11	Start	129,110,950 bp
Band	9q34.11	End	129,148,946 bp

Gene location (Mouse)
Chr.	Chromosome 2 (mouse)
Band	2 B|2 21.71 cM	Start	30,416,039 bp
Band	2 B|2 21.71 cM	End	30,447,806 bp
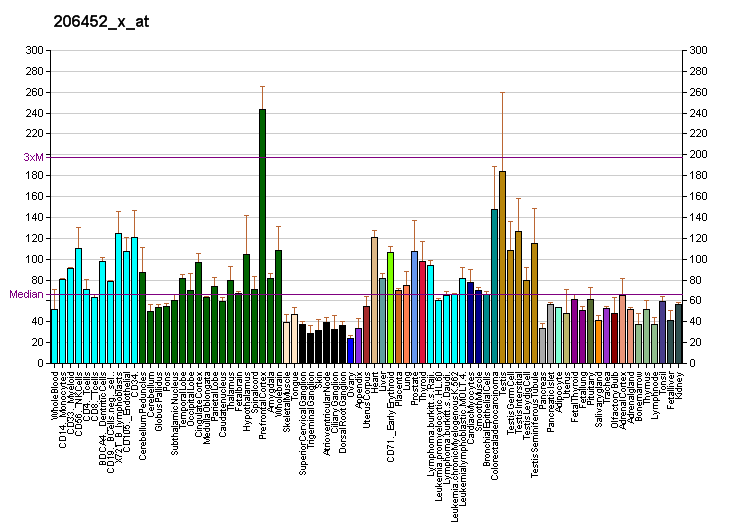

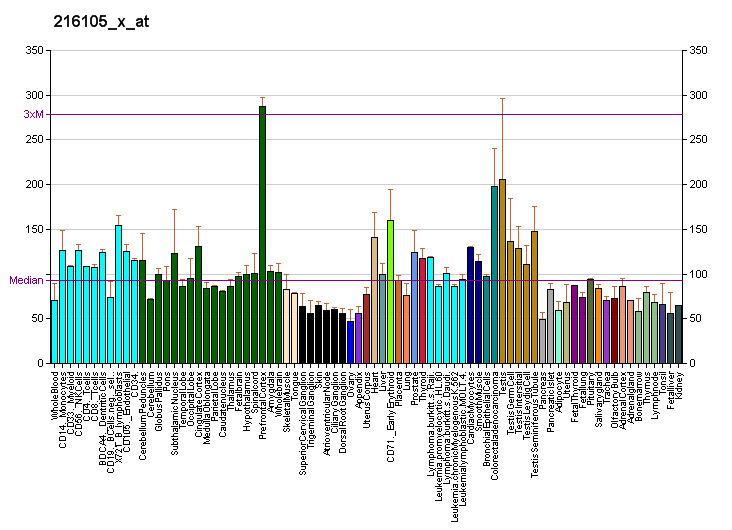

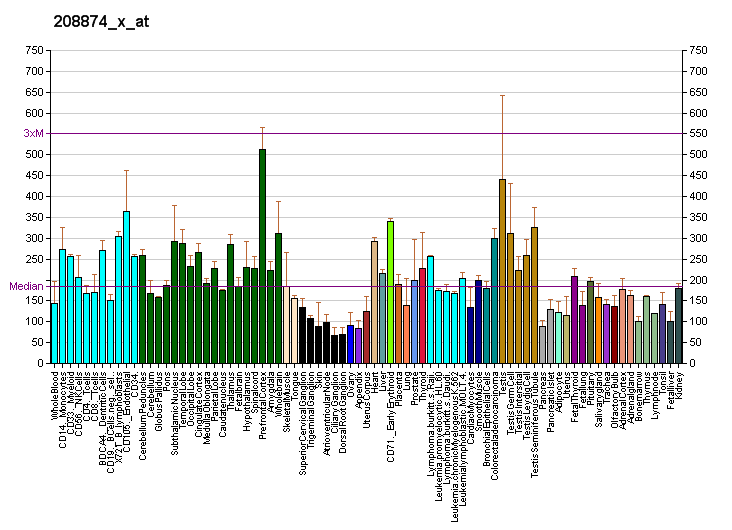
RNA expression pattern
Bgee	Human / Mouse (ortholog); Top expressed in: Brodmann area 10; frontal pole; apex of heart; middle frontal gyrus; right frontal lobe; anterior cingulate cortex; right testis; left testis; paraflocculus of cerebellum; amygdala / Top expressed in: aortic valve; ascending aorta; internal carotid artery; external carotid artery; dentate gyrus of hippocampal formation granule cell; Paneth cell; perirhinal cortex; Rostral migratory stream; molar; lactiferous gland; More reference expression data
BioGPS	More reference expression data
Gene ontology
Molecular function	nucleotide binding; protein tyrosine phosphatase activator activity; protein homodimerization activity; isomerase activity; peptidyl-prolyl cis-trans isomerase activity; ATPase activity; protein binding; protein heterodimerization activity; protein phosphatase 2A binding; phosphatase activator activity; signaling receptor binding; ATP binding; protein phosphatase regulator activity
Cellular component	cytoplasm; calcium channel complex; protein phosphatase type 2A complex; nucleoplasm; extracellular exosome; nucleus
Biological process	negative regulation of protein dephosphorylation; positive regulation of protein dephosphorylation; regulation of phosphoprotein phosphatase activity; positive regulation of phosphoprotein phosphatase activity; positive regulation of apoptotic process; negative regulation of phosphoprotein phosphatase activity; protein peptidyl-prolyl isomerization; mitotic spindle organization
Sources:Amigo / QuickGO
Orthologs
Databases	NCBI: entry; OMA: entry
Species	Human	Mouse
Entrez	5524	110854
Ensembl	ENSG00000119383	ENSMUSG00000039515
UniProt	Q15257	P58389
RefSeq (mRNA)	NM_001193397; NM_001271832; NM_021131; NM_178000; NM_178001 NM_178002; NM_178003	NM_138748
RefSeq (protein)	NP_001180326; NP_001258761; NP_066954; NP_821067; NP_821068 NP_821070	NP_620087; NP_001349662; NP_001349663
Location (UCSC)	Chr 9: 129.11 – 129.15 Mb	Chr 2: 30.42 – 30.45 Mb
PubMed search
- Wikidata
View/Edit Human	View/Edit Mouse

Serine/threonine-protein phosphatase 2A regulatory subunit B is an enzyme that in humans is encoded by the PTPA gene (previously PPP2R4).

Protein phosphatase 2A is one of the four major Ser/Thr phosphatases and is implicated in the negative control of cell growth and division. Protein phosphatase 2A holoenzymes are heterotrimeric proteins composed of a structural subunit A, a catalytic subunit C, and a regulatory subunit B. The regulatory subunit is encoded by a diverse set of genes that have been grouped into the B/PR55, B'/PR61, and B/PR72 families. These different regulatory subunits confer distinct enzymatic specificities and intracellular localizations to the holozenzyme. The product of this gene belongs to the B' family. This gene encodes a specific phosphotyrosyl phosphatase activator of the dimeric form of protein phosphatase 2A. Alternative splicing results in multiple transcript variants encoding different isoforms.

== Interactions ==
PPP2R4 has been shown to interact with PPP2R3A, CCNG1 and Janus kinase 2.
