= PPP2R3A =

Protein-coding gene in the species Homo sapiens

Identifiers
- Aliases: PPP2R3A, PPP2R3, PR130, PR72, protein phosphatase 2 regulatory subunit B''alpha
- External IDs: OMIM: 604944; MGI: 2442104; GeneCards: PPP2R3A
Available structures
| PDB | Human UniProt search: PDBe RCSB |
| PDB | List of PDB id codes 4I5J, 4I5K |

Gene location (Human)
| Chr. | Chromosome 3 (human) |
| Band | 3q22.2-q22.3 | Start | 135,965,728 bp |
| Band | 3q22.2-q22.3 | End | 136,147,894 bp |

Gene location (Mouse)
| Chr. | Chromosome 9 (mouse) |
| Band | 9|9 E4 | Start | 100,982,283 bp |
| Band | 9|9 E4 | End | 101,128,994 bp |
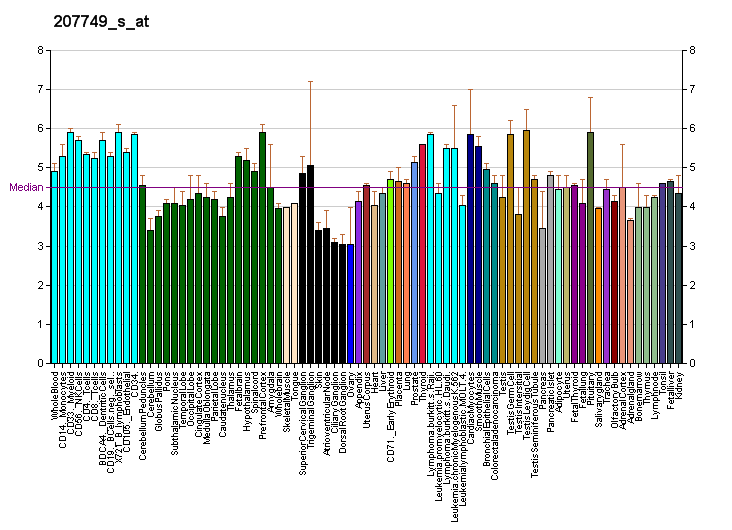

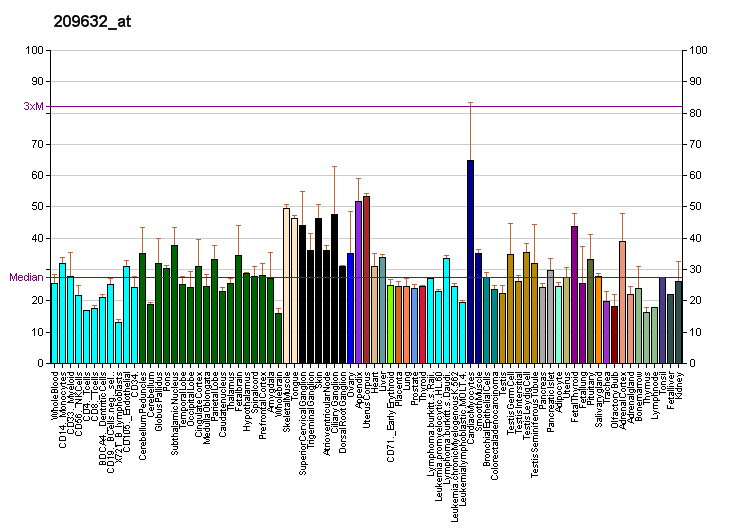

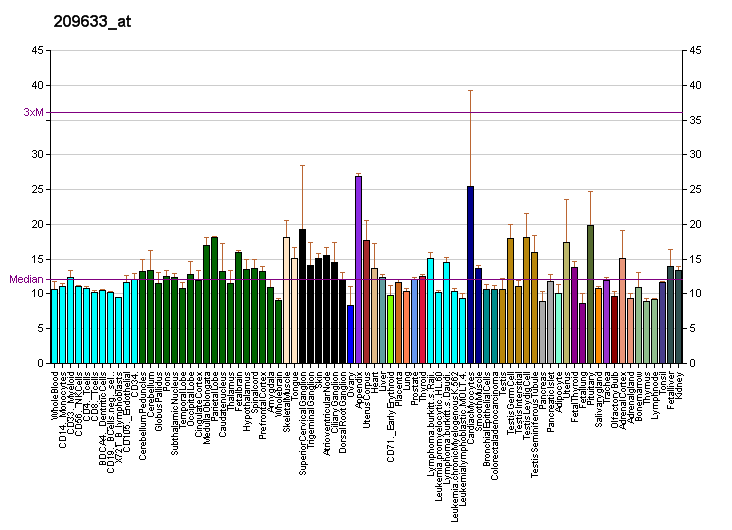
RNA expression pattern
| Bgee | Human / Mouse (ortholog); Top expressed in: biceps brachii; vastus lateralis muscle; Skeletal muscle tissue of rectus abdominis; triceps brachii muscle; Skeletal muscle tissue of biceps brachii; thoracic diaphragm; glutes; deltoid muscle; body of tongue; myocardium of left ventricle / Top expressed in: interventricular septum; triceps brachii muscle; extraocular muscle; sternocleidomastoid muscle; temporal muscle; vastus lateralis muscle; soleus muscle; medial head of gastrocnemius muscle; tibialis anterior muscle; myocardium of ventricle; More reference expression data |
| BioGPS | More reference expression data |
Gene ontology
| Molecular function | calcium ion binding; protein-macromolecule adaptor activity; protein binding; metal ion binding; protein phosphatase regulator activity |
| Cellular component | protein phosphatase type 2A complex |
| Biological process | positive regulation of canonical Wnt signaling pathway; Wnt signaling pathway involved in somitogenesis; protein dephosphorylation; somatic muscle development; eye photoreceptor cell differentiation; positive regulation of protein catabolic process; negative regulation of canonical Wnt signaling pathway; regulation of cell migration involved in somitogenic axis elongation; somite development; regulation of phosphoprotein phosphatase activity |
Sources:Amigo / QuickGO
Orthologs
| Databases | NCBI: entry; OMA: entry |
| Species | Human | Mouse |
| Entrez | 5523 | 235542 |
| Ensembl | ENSG00000073711 | ENSMUSG00000043154 |
| UniProt | Q06190 | n/a |
| RefSeq (mRNA) | NM_001190447; NM_002718; NM_181897 | NM_001161362; NM_172144 |
| RefSeq (protein) | NP_001177376; NP_002709; NP_871626 | n/a |
| Location (UCSC) | Chr 3: 135.97 – 136.15 Mb | Chr 9: 100.98 – 101.13 Mb |
| PubMed search |
- Wikidata
| View/Edit Human | View/Edit Mouse |

Serine/threonine-protein phosphatase 2A regulatory subunit B'' subunit alpha is an enzyme that in humans is encoded by the PPP2R3A gene. Protein phosphatase 2 (formerly named type 2A) is one of the four major Ser/Thr phosphatases and is implicated in the negative control of cell growth and division. Protein phosphatase 2 holoenzymes are heterotrimeric proteins composed of a structural subunit A, a catalytic subunit C, and a regulatory subunit B. The regulatory subunit is encoded by a diverse set of genes that have been grouped into the B/PR55, B'/PR61, and B''/PR72 families. These different regulatory subunits confer distinct enzymatic specificities and intracellular localizations to the holozenzyme. The product of this gene belongs to the B'' family. The B'' family has been further divided into subfamilies. The product of this gene belongs to the alpha subfamily of regulatory subunit B''. Alternative splicing results in multiple transcript variants encoding different isoforms.

== Interactions ==
PPP2R3A has been shown to interact with CDC6 and PPP2R4.
