= B56 domain =

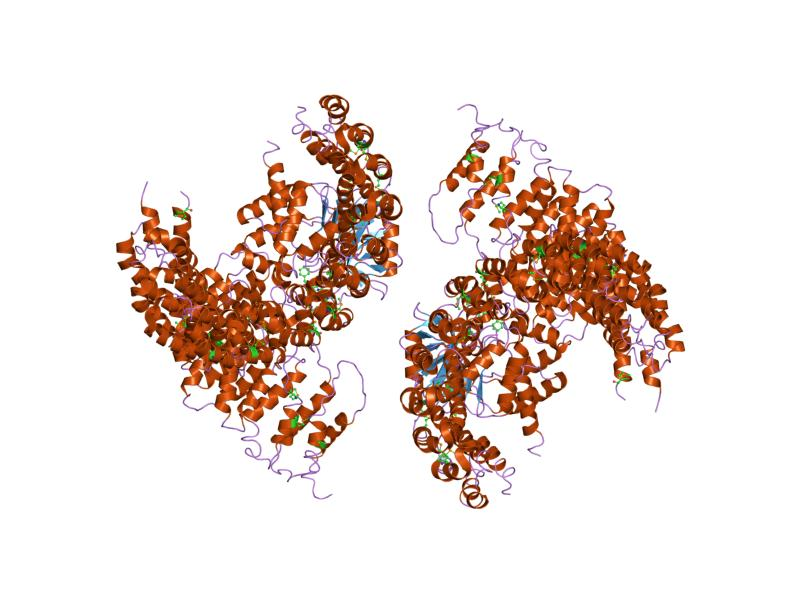
- crystal structure of protein phosphatase 2a (pp2a) holoenzyme with the catalytic subunit carboxyl terminus truncated

Identifiers
- Symbol: B56
- Pfam: PF01603
- InterPro: IPR002554
- SCOP2: 1qq3 / SCOPe / SUPFAM
- TCDB: 5.A.4
Available protein structures:
- PDB: IPR002554 PF01603 (ECOD; PDBsum)
- AlphaFold: IPR002554; PF01603

The B56 domain is a docking site for protein phosphatase 2A (PP2A), a holoenzyme. PP2A is a major intracellular protein phosphatase that regulates multiple aspects of cell growth and metabolism. Phosphorylation enables the activation of this widely distributed heterotrimeric enzyme on a diverse array of substrates andis largely controlled by the nature of its regulatory B subunit. There are multiple families of B subunits, This family is called the B56 family.

== Function ==
Protein phosphatase 2A (PP2A) is a major intracellular protein phosphatase that regulates multiple aspects of cell growth and metabolism such as DNA replication, transcription, translation, cell cycle, development, and apoptosis.

In order to exhibit specificity control over catalysis, hetero-oligomers are formed so the catalytic subunits are complexed with regulatory subunits. This helps direct their action towards the cellular substrate. This is the function of the B56 domain.

B56 alpha, is additionally thought to play a role in nuclear export.

== Structure ==
Regulatory B subunit is a heterotrimer.

== Subcellular Localization ==
Mainly found in the cytoplasm, however various isoforms can be found in the nucleus.

== Isoforms of B56 protein family ==
- B56alpha
- B56beta
- B56delta
- B56epsilon
- B56gamma
