= PPP2R2C =

Protein-coding gene in the species Homo sapiens

Identifiers
- Aliases: PPP2R2C, B55-GAMMA, IMYPNO, IMYPNO1, PR52, PR55G, protein phosphatase 2 regulatory subunit Bgamma, B55gamma
- External IDs: OMIM: 605997; MGI: 2442660; GeneCards: PPP2R2C

Gene location (Human)
Chr.	Chromosome 4 (human)
Band	4p16.1	Start	6,320,578 bp
Band	4p16.1	End	6,563,600 bp

Gene location (Mouse)
Chr.	Chromosome 5 (mouse)
Band	5|5 B3	Start	37,025,857 bp
Band	5|5 B3	End	37,112,422 bp
RNA expression pattern
Bgee	Human / Mouse (ortholog); Top expressed in: middle temporal gyrus; Brodmann area 46; superior frontal gyrus; parietal lobe; postcentral gyrus; occipital lobe; Brodmann area 23; entorhinal cortex; primary visual cortex; prefrontal cortex / Top expressed in: visual cortex; superior frontal gyrus; primary visual cortex; dentate gyrus of hippocampal formation granule cell; primary motor cortex; piriform cortex; prefrontal cortex; cingulate gyrus; olfactory tubercle; cerebellar cortex; More reference expression data
BioGPS	n/a
Gene ontology
Molecular function	protein binding; protein serine/threonine phosphatase activity; protein phosphatase regulator activity
Cellular component	protein phosphatase type 2A complex; cytosol
Biological process	mitotic cell cycle; peptidyl-serine dephosphorylation; developmental process; regulation of phosphoprotein phosphatase activity
Sources:Amigo / QuickGO
Orthologs
Databases	NCBI: entry; OMA: entry
Species	Human	Mouse
Entrez	5522	269643
Ensembl	ENSG00000074211	ENSMUSG00000029120
UniProt	Q9Y2T4	Q8BG02
RefSeq (mRNA)	NM_001206994; NM_001206995; NM_001206996; NM_020416; NM_181876 NM_001363388	NM_172994; NM_001360003
RefSeq (protein)	NP_001193923; NP_001193924; NP_001193925; NP_065149; NP_870991 NP_001350317	NP_766582; NP_001346932
Location (UCSC)	Chr 4: 6.32 – 6.56 Mb	Chr 5: 37.03 – 37.11 Mb
PubMed search
- Wikidata
View/Edit Human	View/Edit Mouse

Serine/threonine-protein phosphatase 2A 55 kDa regulatory subunit B gamma isoform is an enzyme that in humans is encoded by the PPP2R2C gene.

== Function ==
The product of this gene belongs to the phosphatase 2 regulatory subunit B family. Protein phosphatase 2 is one of the four major Ser/Thr phosphatases, and it is implicated in the negative control of cell growth and division. It consists of a common heteromeric core enzyme, which is composed of a catalytic subunit and a constant regulatory subunit, that associates with a variety of regulatory subunits. The B regulatory subunit might modulate substrate selectivity and catalytic activity. This gene encodes a gamma isoform of the regulatory subunit B55 subfamily. Alternatively spliced transcript variants encoding different isoforms have been identified.
