= PPP2CB =

Enzyme found in humans

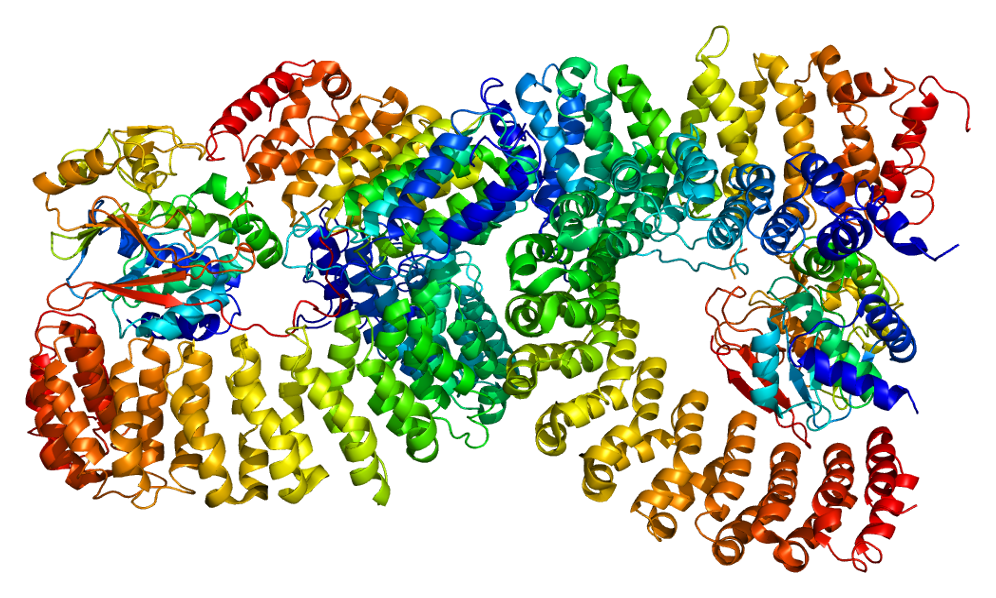

Identifiers
- Aliases: PPP2CB, PP2Abeta, PP2CB, protein phosphatase 2 catalytic subunit beta
- External IDs: OMIM: 176916; MGI: 1321161; GeneCards: PPP2CB
Enzyme activity
EC #	BRENDA	ExPASy	KEGG	MetaCyc
3.1.3.16	↗	↗	↗	↗

Gene location (Human)
Chr.	Chromosome 8 (human)
Band	8p12	Start	30,774,457 bp
Band	8p12	End	30,814,314 bp

Gene location (Mouse)
Chr.	Chromosome 8 (mouse)
Band	8 A4|8 20.63 cM	Start	34,089,653 bp
Band	8 A4|8 20.63 cM	End	34,109,469 bp
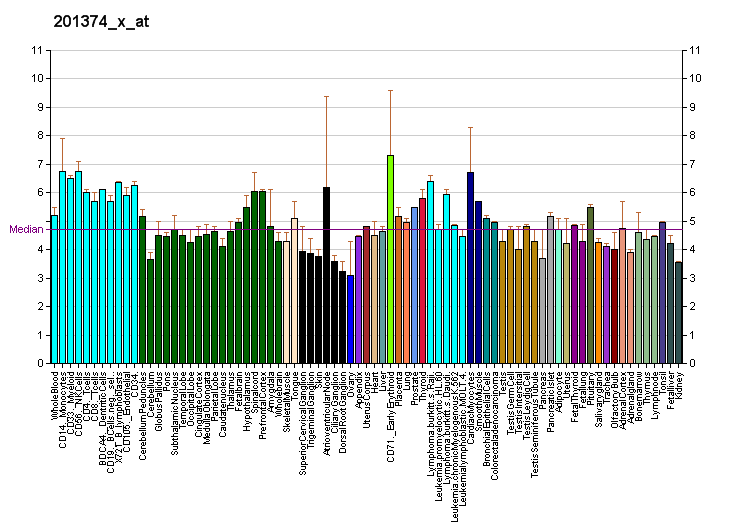

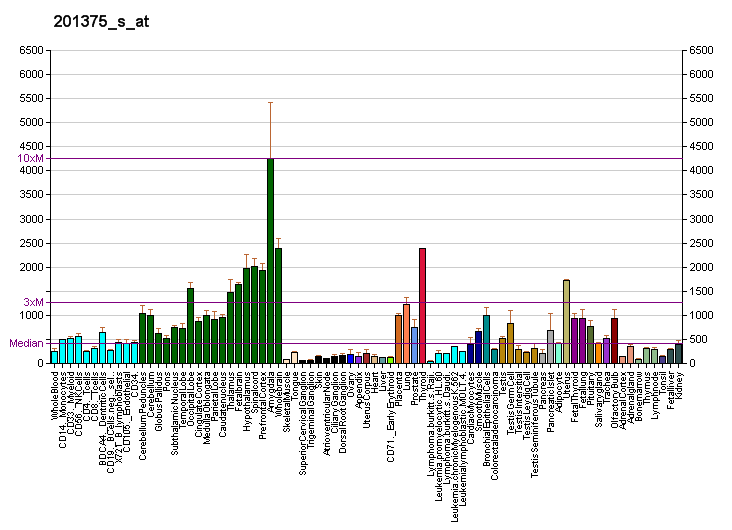
RNA expression pattern
Bgee	Human / Mouse (ortholog); Top expressed in: pons; superior vestibular nucleus; subthalamic nucleus; lateral nuclear group of thalamus; optic nerve; postcentral gyrus; external globus pallidus; bronchial epithelial cell; jejunal mucosa; pars reticulata / Top expressed in: spermatid; molar; granulocyte; spermatocyte; left colon; seminiferous tubule; ventricular zone; medial ganglionic eminence; parotid gland; endothelial cell of lymphatic vessel; More reference expression data
BioGPS	More reference expression data
Gene ontology
Molecular function	phosphoprotein phosphatase activity; metal ion binding; protein binding; hydrolase activity; protein serine/threonine phosphatase activity; protein C-terminus binding; tau protein binding
Cellular component	cytoplasm; cytosol; spindle pole; protein phosphatase type 2A complex; chromosome; chromosome, centromeric region; extracellular exosome; cytoskeleton; nucleus
Biological process	response to antibiotic; response to endoplasmic reticulum stress; apoptotic mitochondrial changes; regulation of gene expression; response to hydrogen peroxide; proteasome-mediated ubiquitin-dependent protein catabolic process; protein dephosphorylation; negative regulation of Ras protein signal transduction; response to lead ion; peptidyl-threonine dephosphorylation; peptidyl-serine dephosphorylation; positive regulation of microtubule binding
Sources:Amigo / QuickGO
Orthologs
Databases	NCBI: entry; OMA: entry
Species	Human	Mouse
Entrez	5516	19053
Ensembl	ENSG00000104695	ENSMUSG00000009630
UniProt	P62714	P62715
RefSeq (mRNA)	NM_004156; NM_001009552	NM_017374
RefSeq (protein)	NP_001009552	NP_059070
Location (UCSC)	Chr 8: 30.77 – 30.81 Mb	Chr 8: 34.09 – 34.11 Mb
PubMed search
- Wikidata
View/Edit Human	View/Edit Mouse

Serine/threonine-protein phosphatase 2A catalytic subunit beta isoform is an enzyme that in humans is encoded by the PPP2CB gene.

== Function ==
This gene encodes the phosphatase 2A catalytic subunit. Protein phosphatase 2A is one of the four major Ser/Thr phosphatases, and it is implicated in the negative control of cell growth and division. It consists of a common heteromeric core enzyme, which is composed of a catalytic subunit and a constant regulatory subunit, that associates with a variety of regulatory subunits. This gene encodes a beta isoform of the catalytic subunit. Two transcript variants encoding the same protein have been identified for this gene.

== Interactions ==
PPP2CB has been shown to interact with TLX1, PPP2R1B and PPP2R1A.

== See also ==
- PPP2CA
