= CHMP =

CHMP may refer to:

- Committee for Medicinal Products for Human Use
- CHMP-FM, a French-language talk radio station located in Montreal, Quebec
- Charged multivesicular body protein (disambiguation) also known as CHMP
  - CHMP1A
  - CHMP1B
  - CHMP2A
  - CHMP2B
  - CHMP4A
  - CHMP4B
  - CHMP4C
  - CHMP5
  - CHMP6
