= Charged multivesicular body protein =

Charged multivesicular body protein may refer to:

- CHMP1A
- CHMP1B
- CHMP2A
- CHMP2B
- CHMP4A
- CHMP4B
- CHMP4C
- CHMP5
- CHMP6

== See also ==
- CHMP (disambiguation)
