= CDC48 N-terminal domain =

Protein domain

CDC48_N
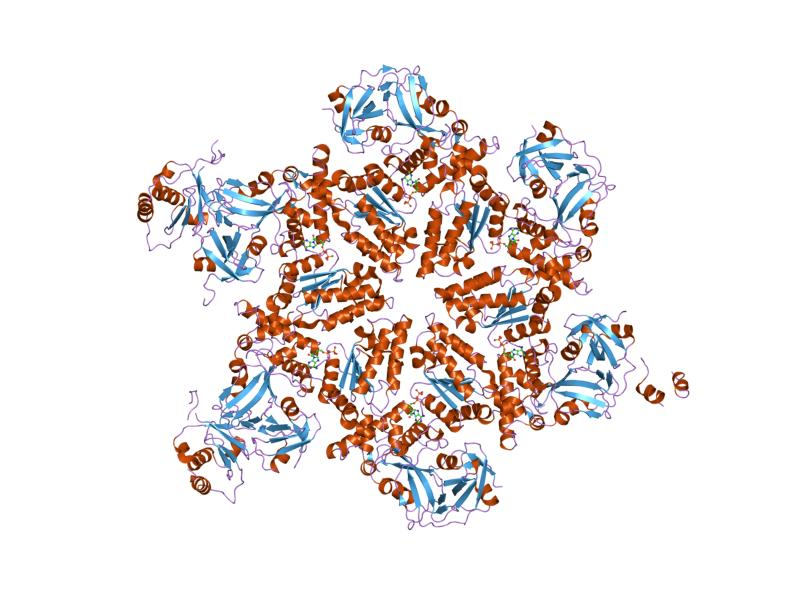
- crystal structure of aaa atpase p97/vcp nd1 in complex with p47 c

Identifiers
- Symbol: CDC48_N
- Pfam: PF02359
- InterPro: IPR003338
- SCOP2: 1cz4 / SCOPe / SUPFAM
Available protein structures:
- Pfam: structures / ECOD
- PDB: RCSB PDB; PDBe; PDBj
- PDBsum: structure summary

CDC48_2
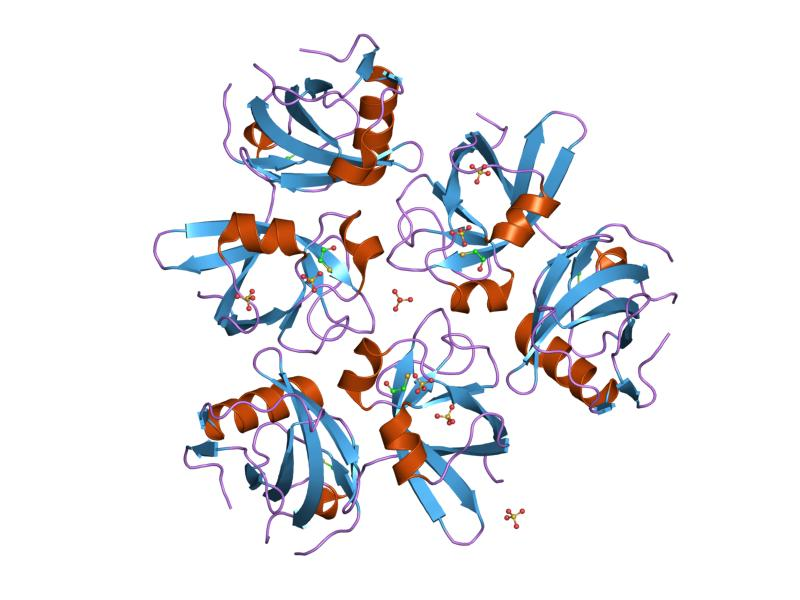
- amino terminal domain of the n-ethylmaleimide sensitive fusion protein (nsf)

Identifiers
- Symbol: CDC48_2
- Pfam: PF02933
- Pfam clan: CL0402
- InterPro: IPR004201
- SCOP2: 1cz4 / SCOPe / SUPFAM
Available protein structures:
- Pfam: structures / ECOD
- PDB: RCSB PDB; PDBe; PDBj
- PDBsum: structure summary

In molecular biology, the CDC48 N-terminal domain is a protein domain found in AAA ATPases including cell division protein 48 (CDC48), VCP-like ATPase and N-ethylmaleimide sensitive fusion protein. It is a substrate recognition domain which binds polypeptides, prevents protein aggregation, and catalyses refolding of permissive substrates. It is composed of two equally sized subdomains. The amino-terminal subdomain (CDC48_N) forms a double-psi beta-barrel whose pseudo-twofold symmetry is mirrored by an internal sequence repeat of 42 residues. The carboxy-terminal subdomain (CDC48_2) forms a novel six-stranded beta-clam fold. Together these subdomains form a kidney-shaped structure, in close agreement with results from electron microscopy. CDC48_N is related to numerous proteins including prokaryotic transcription factors, metabolic enzymes, the protease cofactors UFD1 and PrlF, and aspartic proteinases.
