= HbYX motifs =

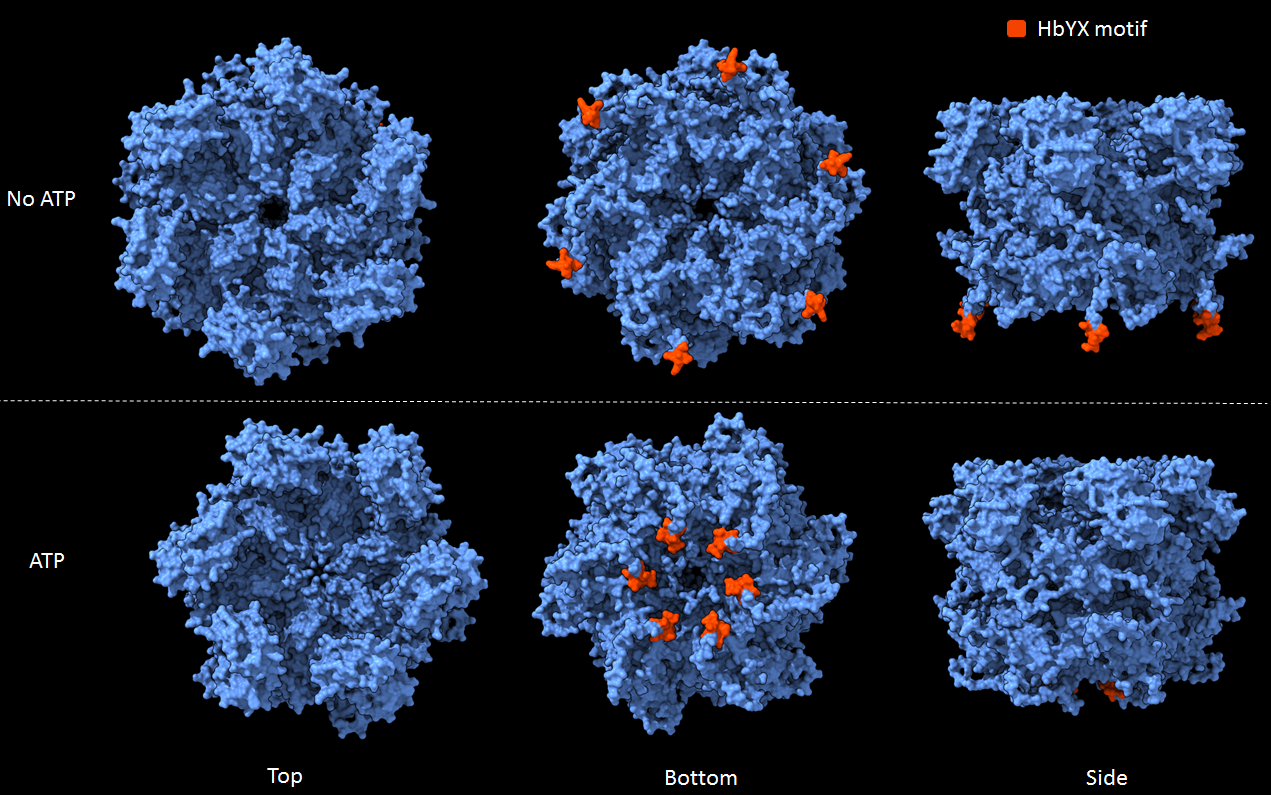
HbYX motif of the Arabidopsis thaliana AAA ATPase CDC48a in its hexameric configuration modeled with 1 ATP per chain using Alphafold3

HbYX motif is a short, evolutionarily conserved peptide sequence found at the C‑termini of several proteasome activators. The "Hb" at the beginning of its name denotes a hydrophobic amino acid residue, "Y" indicates tyrosine, while "X" indicates a variable residue terminating with a free carboxylate group. Originally characterized in archaeal systems, the motif plays a central role in allosterically inducing gate opening of the 20S proteasome—thereby enabling regulated substrate entry and degradation. Recent studies in human and yeast proteasomes have revealed subtle differences in sequence preferences, prompting a re‐definition (in some contexts) of the motif as the “YΦ” motif, in which the penultimate tyrosine is strictly conserved and adjacent aromatic residues may be functionally interchangeable.

== Discovery ==
The HbYX motif was identified from studies of archaeal proteasomes and their activators (e.g., proteasome-81-activating nucleotidase) in the late 1990s and early 2000s. In these systems, the motif was found to be necessary for the binding of regulatory complexes to the α-ring of the 20S proteasome core particle, thereby triggering conformational changes that open a gated central pore. Subsequent work in eukaryotic proteasomes has gone on to reveal that a subset of the 19S ATPase subunits and other activators (such as PA200/Blm10 and PA26) use similar C-terminal sequences to engage the intersubunit pockets of the α-ring.

== Structure ==
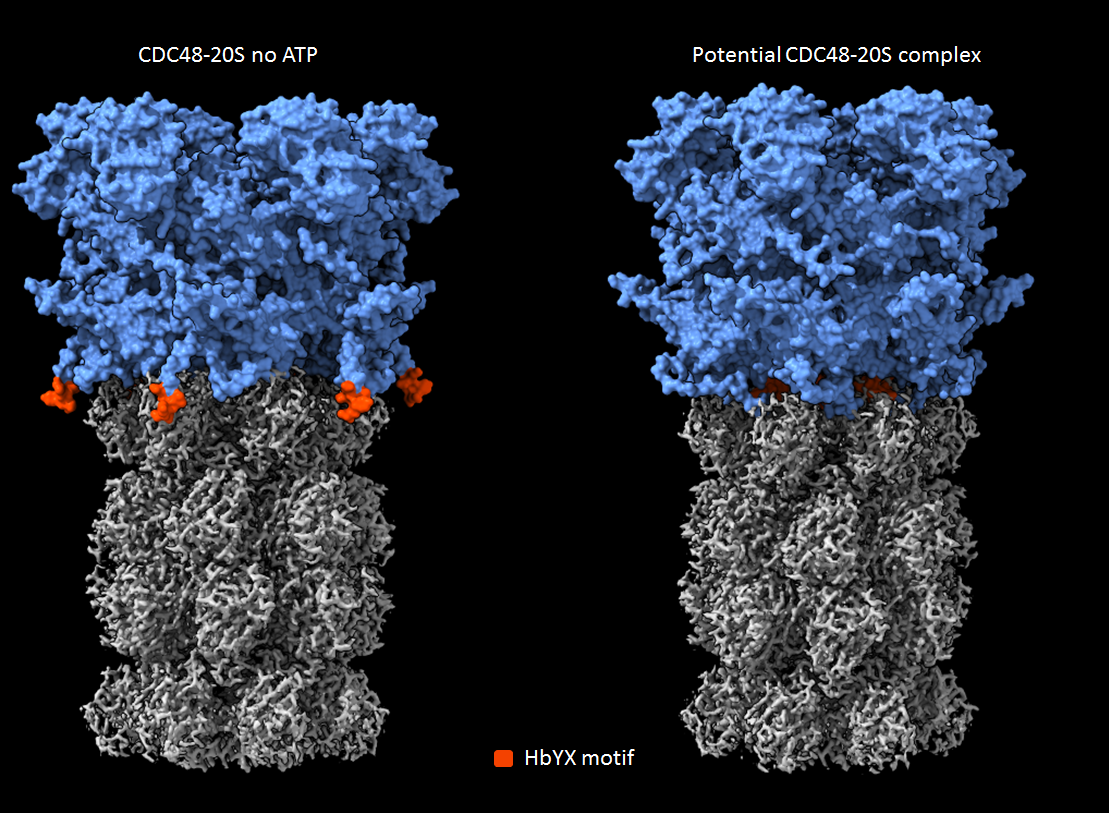
Role of HbYX structural motif in the CDC48-20S complex formation. HbYX motif in orange and 20S Proteasome in gray.

The HbYX motif is a tri-peptide sequence located at the C-terminus of various proteins that interact with the proteasome.

Its structure consists of:

- A hydrophobic amino acid (H) at the first position
- A tyrosine (Y) at the second position
- A variable amino acid (X) at the C-terminal position

This structural arrangement is highly conserved across different species, from archaea to humans. The motif is found in various proteasome activators and regulatory proteins.

== Function ==
=== Proteasomal regulation ===
The HbYX motif serves several key functions in proteasome regulation:

- Proteasome activation: It activates the 20S core particle, enabling more efficient protein degradation.
- Gate control: The motif facilitates the opening of the gate for substrate entry into the 20S core of the proteasome.
- Tethering: It tethers proteasome activators to the 20S core particle, ensuring proper positioning for activation.
- Regulation: By controlling gate opening, it plays a role in regulating protein degradation, ensuring that only proper proteins are degraded.

=== Additional functions ===
Recent bioinformatic analyses have expanded the known functional landscape of the HbYX motif, revealing its widespread presence across diverse biological domains. A large-scale survey of approximately 73 million proteins from over 22,000 reference proteomes identified the motif in eukaryotic, archaeal, bacterial, and viral proteins, highlighting its broader evolutionary significance.

The findings suggest that the HbYX motif plays a role beyond previously characterized proteasomal interactions:

- Evolutionary and Functional Distribution: The motif is found not only in eukaryotes and archaea but also in bacterial and viral proteomes. In certain viral datasets, up to 2% of proteins contain the motif, suggesting a potential role in modulating host proteasome activity.
- Association with Cellular Pathways: In jawed vertebrates, proteins containing the HbYX motif are overrepresented in pathways related to transmembrane transport and neurotransmission. The neuropeptide neurotensin, which carries a C-terminal “YYY” variant, has been experimentally shown to interact with the proteasome, indicating possible roles in neuronal or extracellular proteasome regulation.
- Identification of Novel Proteasome Regulators: The analysis has identified previously uncharacterized proteins, including an archaeal PAN-like ATPase (PAN-2) that binds and activates the 20S proteasome. These findings suggest additional regulatory functions beyond classical proteolysis, providing new directions for research into proteasome-related mechanisms and potential therapeutic targets.

These insights contribute to a more comprehensive understanding of the HbYX motif's role in proteasome regulation and its broader biological implications.

== Mechanism of action ==
The HbYX motif plays a crucial role in proteasome activation and function, particularly in facilitating gate opening for substrate entry into the 20S core of the proteasome. Its mechanism of action involves:

- Docking: The motif docks into specific pockets called α-pockets or intersubunit pockets, located between adjacent α-subunits of the 20S proteasome.
- Binding interactions:
  - The C-terminal carboxylic acid orients towards a conserved lysine residue in the pocket.
  - The hydroxyl group of the penultimate tyrosine forms a hydrogen bond with the backbone carbonyl of a specific glycine residue and is directed toward a proline reverse turn at the base of the proteasome gate.
  - The hydrophobic residue at the beginning of the motif interacts with a hydrophobic pocket in the neighboring α subunit.
- Allosteric changes: These structural interactions trigger conformational changes in the proteasome, leading to gate opening and allowing substrate entry.

The specific arrangement of the HbYX motif and its conserved interactions with the proteasome highlight its importance in regulating protein degradation across various organisms.
