= FL2 =

FL2, FL-2, or similar may refer to:

- FL2 (Lazio regional railways)
- Florida State Road 2, two east–west highways in the U.S. state of Florida
- Florida's 2nd congressional district, a congressional district in the U.S. state of Florida
- Food & Liquor II, the fourth album by American conscious rapper Lupe Fiasco
- Football League Two, the third-highest division of The Football League, and fourth-highest division overall in the English football league system
- Football League 2 (Greece), the third highest professional football league in Greece
- A model of the Chinese Silkworm missile
- Fidgetin-like 2, a human enzyme
