= VPS4B =

Protein-coding gene in the species Homo sapiens

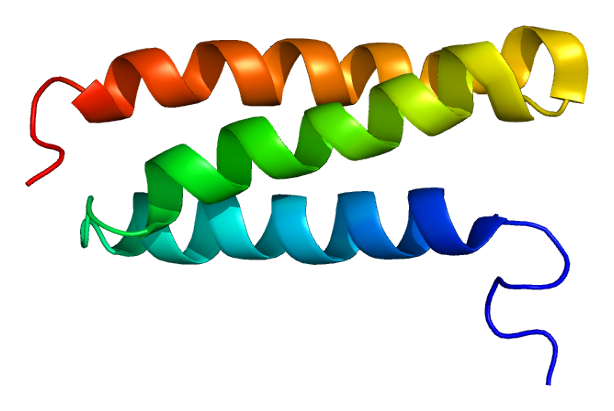

Identifiers
- Aliases: VPS4B, SKD1, SKD1B, VPS4-2, MIG1, vacuolar protein sorting 4 homolog B
- External IDs: OMIM: 609983; MGI: 1100499; GeneCards: VPS4B
Available structures
PDB	Ortholog search: PDBe RCSB
PDB	List of PDB id codes 1WR0, 1XWI, 2CPT, 2JQH, 2JQK, 4U7Y
Enzyme activity
EC #	BRENDA	ExPASy	KEGG	MetaCyc
3.6.4.6	↗	↗	↗	↗

Gene location (Human)
Chr.	Chromosome 18 (human)
Band	18q21.33	Start	63,389,190 bp
Band	18q21.33	End	63,422,483 bp

Gene location (Mouse)
Chr.	Chromosome 1 (mouse)
Band	1|1 E2.1	Start	106,691,801 bp
Band	1|1 E2.1	End	106,724,458 bp
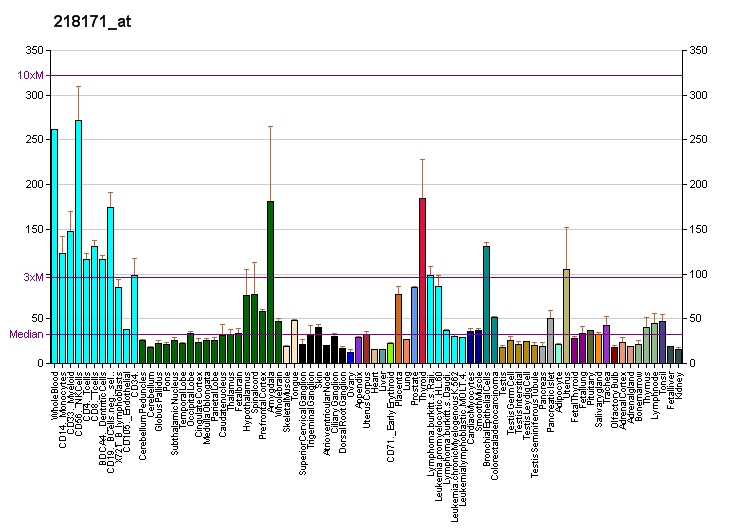
RNA expression pattern
Bgee	Human / Mouse (ortholog); Top expressed in: endothelial cell; amniotic fluid; epithelium of nasopharynx; secondary oocyte; gingival epithelium; mucosa of ileum; oral cavity; Achilles tendon; palpebral conjunctiva; hair follicle / Top expressed in: conjunctival fornix; ciliary body; Paneth cell; lacrimal gland; hair follicle; primitive streak; iris; vestibular sensory epithelium; medullary collecting duct; ureter; More reference expression data
BioGPS	More reference expression data
Gene ontology
Molecular function	nucleotide binding; protein homodimerization activity; ATPase activity; protein C-terminus binding; protein binding; identical protein binding; hydrolase activity; ATP binding
Cellular component	cytoplasm; cytosol; endosome; centrosome; spindle pole; membrane; late endosome membrane; Flemming body; endosome membrane; extracellular exosome; nucleus
Biological process	late endosomal microautophagy; regulation of centrosome duplication; protein depolymerization; viral budding via host ESCRT complex; viral life cycle; nucleus organization; cholesterol transport; negative regulation of exosomal secretion; multivesicular body assembly; negative regulation of cell death; regulation of mitotic spindle assembly; endosome organization; cell division; positive regulation of centriole elongation; endosomal transport; potassium ion transport; response to lipid; ubiquitin-independent protein catabolic process via the multivesicular body sorting pathway; protein transport; ubiquitin-dependent protein catabolic process via the multivesicular body sorting pathway; positive regulation of G2/M transition of mitotic cell cycle; positive regulation of exosomal secretion; septum digestion after cytokinesis; mitotic metaphase plate congression; endosome to lysosome transport via multivesicular body sorting pathway; cell cycle; ESCRT III complex disassembly; macroautophagy; transport; positive regulation of viral process; vacuole organization; midbody abscission
Sources:Amigo / QuickGO
Orthologs
Databases	NCBI: entry; OMA: entry
Species	Human	Mouse
Entrez	9525	20479
Ensembl	ENSG00000119541	ENSMUSG00000009907
UniProt	O75351	P46467
RefSeq (mRNA)	NM_004869	NM_009190
RefSeq (protein)	NP_004860; NP_004860.2	NP_033216
Location (UCSC)	Chr 18: 63.39 – 63.42 Mb	Chr 1: 106.69 – 106.72 Mb
PubMed search
- Wikidata
View/Edit Human	View/Edit Mouse

Vacuolar protein sorting-associated protein 4B is a protein that in humans is encoded by the VPS4B gene.

The protein encoded by this gene is a member of the AAA protein family (ATPases associated with diverse cellular activities), and is the homolog of the yeast Vps4 protein.

In humans, two paralogs of the yeast protein have been identified. They share a high degree of amino acid sequence similarity with each other and also with yeast Vps4 and mouse proteins. Functional studies indicate that both human paralogs associate with the endosomal compartments, and are involved in intracellular protein trafficking, similar to Vps4 protein in yeast. The gene encoding this paralog has been mapped to chromosome 18; the gene for the other (VPS4A) resides on chromosome 16.
