= Katanin =

Microtubule-severing protein

Katanin is a microtubule-severing AAA protein found in humans and many other organisms. It is named after the Japanese sword called a katana. Katanin is a heterodimeric protein first discovered in sea urchins. It contains a 60 kDa ATPase subunit, encoded by KATNA1, which functions to sever microtubules. This subunit requires ATP and the presence of microtubules for activation. The second 80 kDA subunit, encoded by KATNB1, regulates the activity of the ATPase and localizes the protein to centrosomes. Electron microscopy shows that katanin forms 14–16 nm rings in its active oligomerized state on the walls of microtubules (although not around the microtubule).

== Mechanism and regulation of microtubule length ==
Structural analysis using electron microscopy has revealed that microtubule protofilaments change from a straight to a curved conformation upon GTP hydrolysis of β-tubulin. However, when these protofilaments are part of a polymerized microtubule, the stabilizing interactions created by the surrounding lattice lock subunits into a straight conformation, even after GTP hydrolysis. In order to disrupt these stable interactions, katanin, once bound to ATP, oligomerizes into a ring structure on the microtubule wall - in some cases oligomerization increases the affinity of katanin for microtubules and stimulates its ATPase activity. Once this structure is formed, katanin hydrolyzes ATP, and likely undergoes a conformational change that puts mechanical strain on the tubulin subunits, which destabilizes their interactions within the microtubule lattice. The predicted conformational change also likely decreases the affinity of katanin for tubulin as well as for other katanin proteins, which leads to disassembly of the katanin ring structure, and recycling of the individual inactivated proteins.

The severing of microtubules by katanin is regulated by protective microtubule-associated proteins (MAPs), and the p80 subunit (p60 severs microtubules much better in the presence of p80). These mechanisms have different consequences, depending on where in the cell they are activated or disrupted. For example, allowing katanin-mediated severing at the centrosome releases microtubules for free movement. In one experiment, anti-katanin antibodies were injected into a cell, causing a large accumulation of microtubules around the centrosome and inhibition of microtubule outgrowth. Therefore, katanin-mediated severing may serve to maintain organization in the cytoplasm by promoting microtubule disassembly and efficient movement. During cell division, severing at the spindle pole produces free microtubule ends and allows poleward flux of tubulin and retraction of the microtubule. Severing microtubules in the cytoplasm facilitates treadmilling and mobility, which is important during development.

== Role in cell division ==
Katanin-mediated microtubule severing is an important step in mitosis and meiosis. It has been shown that katanin is responsible for severing microtubules during M-phase in Xenopus laevis. The disassembly of microtubules from their interphase structures is necessary to prepare the cell and the mitotic spindle for cell division. This regulation is indirect: MAP proteins, which protect the microtubules from being severed during interphase, dissociate and allow katanin to act. In addition, katanin is responsible for severing microtubules at the mitotic spindles when disassembly is required to segregate sister chromatids during anaphase. Similar results have been obtained in relation to katanin's activity during meiosis in C. elegans. It was reported that Mei-1 and Mei-2 to encode similar proteins to the p60 and p80 subunits of katanin. Using antibodies, these two proteins were found to localize at the ends of microtubules in the meiotic spindle, and, when expressed in HeLa cells, these proteins initiated microtubule severing. These findings indicate that katanin serves a similar purpose in both mitosis and meiosis in segregating chromatids toward the spindle poles.

== Role in development ==
Katanin is important in the development of many organisms. Both elimination and overexpression of katanin is deleterious to axonal growth, and, thus, katanin must be carefully regulated for proper neural development. In particular, severing microtubules in specific cellular spaces allows fragments to test various routes of growth. Katanin has proved necessary in this task. An experiment using time-lapse digital imaging of fluorescently labeled tubulin demonstrated that axon growth cones pause, and microtubules fragment, at sites of branching during neural development.

A similar experiment using fluorescently labeled tubulin observed local microtubule fragmentation in newt lung cell lamellipodia during developmental migration, in which the fragments run perpendicular to the advancing cell membrane to aid exploration. The local nature of both fragmentation events likely indicates regulation by katanin because it can be concentrated in specific cellular regions. This is supported by a study that demonstrated that the Fra2 mutation, which affects a katanin orthologue in Arabidopsis thaliana, leads to an aberrant disposition of cellulose microfibrils along the developing cell wall in these plants. This mutation produced a phenotype with reduced cell elongation, which suggests katanin's significance in development across a wide range of organisms.

== Function in neurons ==
Katanin is known to be abundant in the nervous system and even modest levels of it can cause significant microtubule depletion. But microtubules need to be severed throughout other compartments of the neuron so that sufficient numbers of microtubules can undergo rapid transport.

In the nervous system, the ratio of the two subunits is dramatically different from other organs of the body. So it is important to be able to regulate the ratio to control microtubule severing. The monomer p80 is found in all the compartments of the neuron, which means its function cannot be solely to target katanin. The p80 katanin has multiple domains with different functions. One domain targets the centrosome, another augments microtubule severing by the p60 katanin, and the last suppresses microtubule severing. The abundance of katanin in the neurons show they can move along the axon. There is breakage of microtubules at the axonal branch points and in the growth cones of the neurons. The distribution of katanin in the neuron helps understand the phenomenon for regulating microtubule length and number, as well as releasing the microtubules from the centrosome.

Katanin is believed to be regulated by the phosphorylation of other proteins. Bending enhances the access of katanin to the lattice, facilitating severing.

== Function in plants ==
Katanin is also found to have similar functions in higher plants. The form and structure of a plant cell is determined by the rigid cell wall, which contains highly organized cellulose, the orientation of which is affected by microtubules that serve to guide the deposition of forming fibers. The orientation of the cellulose microfibrils within the cell wall is determined by the microtubules, which are aligned perpendicular to the major axis of cell expansion. Because plant cells lack traditional centrosomes, katanin accumulates at the nuclear envelope during pre-prophase and prophase, where the spindle microtubules are forming.

During cell elongation, microtubules must adjust their orientation constantly to keep up with the increasing cell length. This constant change in microtubule organization was proposed to be performed by the rapid disassembly, assembly, and translocation of microtubules. Recently, mutations in the plant katanin homologue have been shown to alter transitions in microtubule organization, which, in turn, cause impairments in the proper deposition of cellulose and hemicellulose. This is presumed to be caused by the plant cell's lack of ability to regulate microtubule lengths.

The p80 katanin regulatory subunit is encoded by four genes in Arabidopsis. Therefore, a His-tagged At-p60 was made to describe its functions in plants. The His-At-p60 can sever microtubules in vitro in the presence of ATP. It directly interacts with microtubules in co-sedimentation assays. The ATPase activity was stimulated in a non-hyperbolic way. ATP hydrolysis is stimulated at a low tubulin/At-p60 ratio and inhibited at higher ratios. The low ratios favor the katanin subunit interactions, whereas the high ratios show impairment. The At-p60 can oligomerize like the ones in animals. The At-p60 interacts directly with microtubules, whereas the animal p60 bind via their N-termini. The N-terminal part of p60 is not well conserved between the plant and animal kingdoms.

== See also ==
- Microtubule-severing ATPase
