= NVL =

NVL may refer to:

- NVL (gene), a human protein
- NVL (novel), a video game display element
- NVL (SQL), an Oracle Database function
- Nadimpalli Venkata Lakshmi Narasimha Rao (1890–1978), Indian politician
- Naugatuck Valley League, a high school athletic conference in Connecticut, US
- No Vacancy Lounge, a nightclub in Portland, US (2017–2019)
