= ATAD2 =

Human protein-coding gene

Identifiers
- Aliases: ATAD2, ANCCA, CT137, PRO2000, ATPase family, AAA domain containing 2, ATPase family AAA domain containing 2
- External IDs: OMIM: 611941; MGI: 1917722; GeneCards: ATAD2
Available structures
PDB	Ortholog search: PDBe RCSB
PDB	List of PDB id codes 3DAI, 4QSP, 4QSQ, 4QSR, 4QSS, 4QST, 4QSU, 4QSV, 4QSW, 4QSX, 4QUT, 4QUU, 4TT2, 4TT4, 4TT6, 4TTE, 4TU4, 4TU6, 4TYL, 4TZ2, 4TZ8, 5A5N, 5A5O, 5A5P, 5A5Q, 5A5R, 5A81, 5A82, 5A83

Gene location (Human)
Chr.	Chromosome 8 (human)
Band	8q24.13	Start	123,319,850 bp
Band	8q24.13	End	123,416,350 bp

Gene location (Mouse)
Chr.	Chromosome 15 (mouse)
Band	15|15 D1	Start	57,957,440 bp
Band	15|15 D1	End	57,998,478 bp
RNA expression pattern
Bgee	Human / Mouse (ortholog); Top expressed in: secondary oocyte; ventricular zone; testicle; ganglionic eminence; bone marrow; amniotic fluid; trabecular bone; sperm; gonad; tendon of biceps brachii / Top expressed in: tail of embryo; genital tubercle; epiblast; spermatid; bone marrow; thymus; ventricular zone; zygote; uterus; morula; More reference expression data
BioGPS	n/a
Gene ontology
Molecular function	nucleotide binding; histone binding; chromatin binding; hydrolase activity; ATP binding; ATPase activity; protein binding
Cellular component	extracellular exosome; nucleus; nucleoplasm
Biological process	positive regulation of transcription, DNA-templated; regulation of transcription, DNA-templated; transcription, DNA-templated; positive regulation of transcription by RNA polymerase II; chromatin organization; regulation of transcription by RNA polymerase II
Sources:Amigo / QuickGO
Orthologs
Databases	NCBI: entry; OMA: entry
Species	Human	Mouse
Entrez	29028	70472
Ensembl	ENSG00000156802	ENSMUSG00000022360
UniProt	Q6PL18	Q8CDM1
RefSeq (mRNA)	NM_014109	NM_027435; NM_153199
RefSeq (protein)	NP_054828	NP_081711; NP_001391691; NP_001391693; NP_001391694; NP_001391695
Location (UCSC)	Chr 8: 123.32 – 123.42 Mb	Chr 15: 57.96 – 58 Mb
PubMed search
- Wikidata
View/Edit Human	View/Edit Mouse

ATPase family AAA domain containing 2 is a protein that in humans is encoded by the ATAD2 gene.

The protein encoded by this gene contains two AAA domains and a bromodomain. It acts as a coactivator of transcription factors. Overexpression of ATAD2 promotes cellular proliferation and is associated with poorer outcomes in several types of cancer. ATAD2 has therefore been investigated as both a prognostic biomarker and a potential drug target for cancer treatment.

== Structure ==
ATAD2 is a nuclear protein of 1,390 amino acids containing an acidic N-terminal region, two tandem AAA+ ATPase domains, a bromodomain and a C-terminal domain. Its ATPase domain supports ATP-dependent activity and oligomerization, while its bromodomain forms a four-helix bundle that recognizes acetylated lysine residues on histone tails, promoting association with chromatin.

== Function ==
ATAD2 participates in chromatin organization, DNA replication and transcriptional regulation. It acts as a transcriptional coactivator for estrogen and androgen receptors, MYC and E2F transcription factors.

== Clinical significance ==
=== Cancer ===
ATAD2 promotes the expression of genes involved in cell proliferation and survival. It is frequently overexpressed in cancers, where increased expression is associated with tumor progression and poorer prognosis.

=== Biomarker ===
ATAD2 has been proposed as a prognostic biomarker in several cancers. A meta-analysis of 13 studies involving 2,689 patients associated high ATAD2 expression with shorter overall survival and poorer recurrence-related outcomes.

=== As a drug target ===
ATAD2 is being investigated as a cancer drug target because experimental inhibition or depletion can suppress cancer cell growth. Its acetyllysine-binding bromodomain provides a binding site for small-molecule inhibitors.
