= Paraplegin =

Protein-coding gene in the species Homo sapiens

SPG7

Identifiers
- Aliases: SPG7, CAR, CMAR, PGN, SPG5C, paraplegin matrix AAA peptidase subunit, SPG7 matrix AAA peptidase subunit, paraplegin
- External IDs: OMIM: 602783; MGI: 2385906; GeneCards: SPG7
Available structures
PDB	Ortholog search: PDBe RCSB
PDB	List of PDB id codes 2QZ4

Gene location (Human)
Chr.	Chromosome 16 (human)
Band	16q24.3	Start	89,490,719 bp
Band	16q24.3	End	89,557,766 bp

Gene location (Mouse)
Chr.	Chromosome 8 (mouse)
Band	8|8 E1	Start	123,789,681 bp
Band	8|8 E1	End	123,824,499 bp
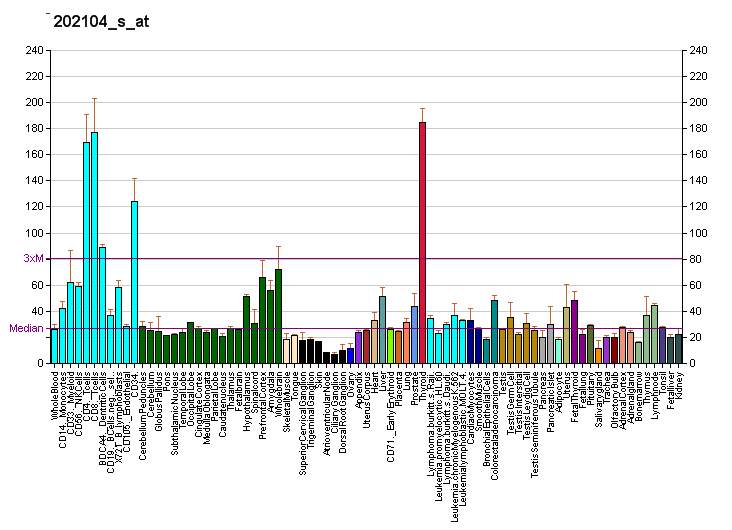

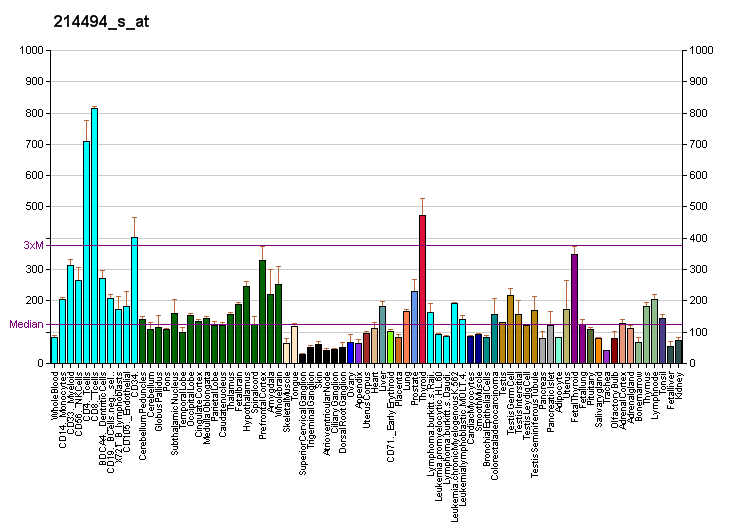
RNA expression pattern
Bgee	Human / Mouse (ortholog); Top expressed in: gonad; sural nerve; left lobe of thyroid gland; apex of heart; right lobe of thyroid gland; gastric mucosa; right hemisphere of cerebellum; anterior pituitary; left ovary; right ovary / Top expressed in: neural layer of retina; spermatocyte; muscle of thigh; interventricular septum; spermatid; right kidney; superior frontal gyrus; lip; primary visual cortex; skeletal muscle tissue; More reference expression data
BioGPS	More reference expression data
Gene ontology
Molecular function	unfolded protein binding; nucleotide binding; peptidase activity; zinc ion binding; metalloendopeptidase activity; protein binding; hydrolase activity; ATP binding; metallopeptidase activity; metal ion binding
Cellular component	integral component of membrane; mitochondrion; membrane; mitochondrial inner membrane; mitochondrial permeability transition pore complex; m-AAA complex; axon cytoplasm
Biological process	proteolysis; nervous system development; mitochondrial calcium ion transmembrane transport; regulation of mitochondrial membrane permeability; mitochondrial outer membrane permeabilization involved in programmed cell death; mitochondrion organization; anterograde axonal transport
Sources:Amigo / QuickGO
Orthologs
Databases	NCBI: entry; OMA: entry
Species	Human	Mouse
Entrez	6687	234847
Ensembl	ENSG00000197912	ENSMUSG00000000738
UniProt	Q9UQ90	Q3ULF4
RefSeq (mRNA)	NM_003119; NM_199367; NM_001363850	NM_153176; NM_001364435
RefSeq (protein)	NP_003110; NP_955399; NP_001350779	NP_694816; NP_001351364
Location (UCSC)	Chr 16: 89.49 – 89.56 Mb	Chr 8: 123.79 – 123.82 Mb
PubMed search
- Wikidata
View/Edit Human	View/Edit Mouse

Paraplegin is a protein that in humans is encoded by the SPG7 gene located on chromosome 16.

== Structure ==
The SPG7 gene contains 21 exons and encodes for a protein that is approximately 88 kDa in size. Two transcript variants encoding distinct isoforms have been identified for this gene.

The structure of the SPG7 resolved by X-ray crystallography reveals that the protein functions as a hexamer and is structurally most similar to bacterial FtSH proteases. It contains an FtsH-homology protease domain as well as an AAA+ homology ATPase domain. The protein is thought to use ATPase-driven conformational changes to the AAA-domain in order to deliver the substrate peptides to be degraded to its protease core.

== Function ==
The SPG7 protein is a nuclear-encoded metalloprotease protein that is a member of the AAA protein family. Members of this protein family share an ATPase domain and have roles in diverse cellular processes including membrane trafficking, intracellular motility, organelle biogenesis, protein folding, and proteolysis. The SPG7 protein is a transmembrane protein that is located to the inner mitochondrial membrane, and is part of the m-AAA metalloproteinase complex, which constitutes one of the known intra-mitochondrial proteases that function in mitochondrial protein quality control.

== Interactions ==
SPG7 interacts with AFG like AAA ATPase 2 (AFG3L2) on the mitochondrial inner membrane to form the m-AAA metalloproteinase complex.

== Clinical significance ==
Mutations associated with this gene cause autosomal recessive spastic paraplegia 7, a neurodegenerative disorder that is characterized by a slow, gradual, progressive weakness and spasticity of the lower limbs. SPG7 mutations have also been associated with other undiagnosed ataxia.

In model animals, knockdown of spastic paraplegia 7 by siRNA inhibits the early stages of HIV-1 replication in 293T cells infected with VSV-G pseudotyped HIV-1. It has been shown that an SPG7 variant escapes phosphorylation-regulated processing by AFG3L2 and increases mitochondrial reactive oxygen species generation and is correlated with many clinical phenotypes. Furthermore, SPG7 deficiency is associated with abnormal mitochondrial DNA maintenance, which may lead to secondary mitochondrial DNA lesions and impaired respiratory activities and mitochondrial functions.
