= MDN1 =

Protein-coding gene in the species Homo sapiens

Identifiers
- Aliases: MDN1, Rea1, midasin AAA ATPase 1
- External IDs: OMIM: 618200; MGI: 1926159; GeneCards: MDN1

Gene location (Human)
Chr.	Chromosome 6 (human)
Band	6q15	Start	89,642,498 bp
Band	6q15	End	89,819,794 bp

Gene location (Mouse)
Chr.	Chromosome 4 (mouse)
Band	4 A5|4 14.3 cM	Start	32,657,119 bp
Band	4 A5|4 14.3 cM	End	32,775,217 bp
RNA expression pattern
Bgee	Human / Mouse (ortholog); Top expressed in: right lobe of liver; gonad; testicle; cerebellar hemisphere; right hemisphere of cerebellum; nucleus accumbens; putamen; primary visual cortex; caudate nucleus; substantia nigra / Top expressed in: tail of embryo; primitive streak; epiblast; genital tubercle; morula; spermatocyte; otic placode; embryo; paraventricular nucleus of hypothalamus; blastocyst; More reference expression data
BioGPS	n/a
Gene ontology
Molecular function	protein binding; ATPase activity; unfolded protein binding; ATP binding; nucleotide binding
Cellular component	nucleus; intermediate filament cytoskeleton; nucleolus; membrane; cytosol; preribosome, large subunit precursor; nucleoplasm; cytoplasm
Biological process	rRNA processing; ribosomal large subunit assembly; protein-containing complex assembly
Sources:Amigo / QuickGO
Orthologs
Databases	NCBI: entry; OMA: entry
Species	Human	Mouse
Entrez	23195	100019
Ensembl	ENSG00000112159; ENSG00000288121	ENSMUSG00000058006
UniProt	Q9NU22	n/a
RefSeq (mRNA)	NM_014611	NM_001081392; NM_133874; NM_177666
RefSeq (protein)	NP_055426	n/a
Location (UCSC)	Chr 6: 89.64 – 89.82 Mb	Chr 4: 32.66 – 32.78 Mb
PubMed search
- Wikidata
View/Edit Human	View/Edit Mouse

MDN1, midasin homolog (yeast) is a protein that in humans is encoded by the MDN1 gene. Midasin is a member AAA ATPase family.
