= LONP1 =

Human protein and coding gene

Identifiers
- Aliases: LONP1, LON, LONP, LonHS, PIM1, PRSS15, hLON, CODASS, lon peptidase 1, mitochondrial, Lon protease homolog, mitochondrial
- External IDs: OMIM: 605490; MGI: 1921392; GeneCards: LONP1
Available structures
PDB	Ortholog search: PDBe RCSB
PDB	List of PDB id codes 2X36
Enzyme activity
EC #	BRENDA	ExPASy	KEGG	MetaCyc
3.4.21.53	↗	↗	↗	↗
3.6.4.10	↗	↗	↗	↗

Gene location (Human)
Chr.	Chromosome 19 (human)
Band	19p13.3	Start	5,691,834 bp
Band	19p13.3	End	5,720,572 bp

Gene location (Mouse)
Chr.	Chromosome 17 (mouse)
Band	17|17 D	Start	56,921,297 bp
Band	17|17 D	End	56,933,887 bp
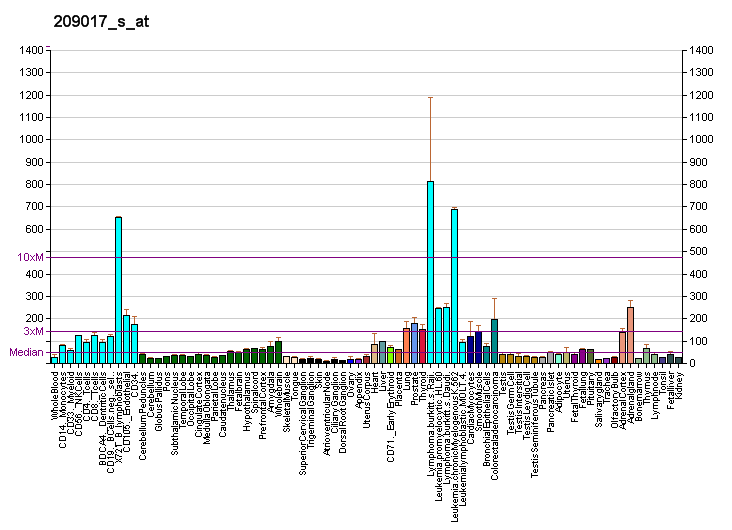
RNA expression pattern
Bgee	Human / Mouse (ortholog); Top expressed in: right adrenal gland; right adrenal cortex; left adrenal gland; left adrenal cortex; apex of heart; stromal cell of endometrium; left ventricle; anterior pituitary; right lobe of liver; muscle of thigh / Top expressed in: adrenal medulla; Ileal epithelium; right kidney; muscle of thigh; primitive streak; right ventricle; proximal tubule; brown adipose tissue; left lobe of liver; epiblast; More reference expression data
BioGPS	More reference expression data
Gene ontology
Molecular function	nucleotide binding; DNA binding; mitochondrial promoter sequence-specific DNA binding; ADP binding; DNA polymerase binding; G-quadruplex DNA binding; peptidase activity; ATPase activity; protein binding; single-stranded RNA binding; serine-type peptidase activity; serine-type endopeptidase activity; hydrolase activity; ATP binding; ATP-dependent peptidase activity; sequence-specific DNA binding; single-stranded DNA binding
Cellular component	membrane; nucleoplasm; mitochondrial matrix; mitochondrial nucleoid; nucleus; mitochondrion; cytosol
Biological process	mitochondrial DNA metabolic process; mitochondrial genome maintenance; ageing; mitochondrion organization; proteolysis; protein catabolic process; response to aluminum ion; response to hormone; proteolysis involved in cellular protein catabolic process; protein homooligomerization; protein quality control for misfolded or incompletely synthesized proteins; response to hypoxia; cellular response to oxidative stress; oxidation-dependent protein catabolic process; chaperone-mediated protein complex assembly
Sources:Amigo / QuickGO
Orthologs
Databases	NCBI: entry; OMA: entry
Species	Human	Mouse
Entrez	9361	74142
Ensembl	ENSG00000196365	ENSMUSG00000041168
UniProt	P36776	Q8CGK3
RefSeq (mRNA)	NM_001276479; NM_001276480; NM_004793	NM_028782
RefSeq (protein)	NP_001263408; NP_001263409; NP_004784	NP_083058
Location (UCSC)	Chr 19: 5.69 – 5.72 Mb	Chr 17: 56.92 – 56.93 Mb
PubMed search
- Wikidata
View/Edit Human	View/Edit Mouse

Lon protease homolog, mitochondrial is a protease, an enzyme that in humans is encoded by the LONP1 gene.

== Structure ==
The nuclear-gene encoded mitochondrial matrix LON peptidase 1 (LONP1), originally thought to be responsible for protein quality control (PQC) by degrading unfolded or misfolded proteins, has several essential functions like proteolytic activity, chaperone activity and mitochondrial DNA (mtDNA) regulation. Lon protease is a member of ATP-dependent proteases (AAA+ proteases). Mature LONP1 is catalytically active in its homohexameric structure, while other formations of complexes have been observed such as the homoheptameric ring in Saccharomyces cerevisiae. A single subunit of LONP1 consists of three domains: The N-domain for substrate recognition and binding, an AAA + module (A-domain) for ATP binding and hydrolysis, and a P-domain for protein proteolysis. A homologous protease to LONP1 expressed in E. coli regulates gene expression by targeting specific regulatory proteins for degradation. Moreover, LONP1 is able to bind a specific sequence in the light and heavy chain promoters of the mitochondrial genome which are involved in regulation of mtDNA replication and transcription.

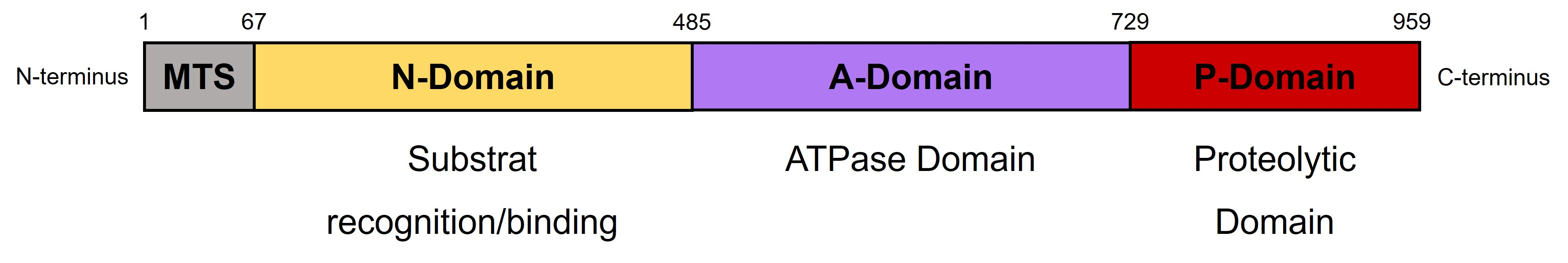
Monomeric domain structure of LONP1

== Function ==
Lon protease (LONP1) is a conserved serine peptidase identified from bacteria to eukaryotic cells. In mitochondrial matrix, a majority of damaged proteins is removed via proteolysis led by Lon protease, which is an essential mechanism for mitochondrial protein quality control. LONP1 is the major protease responsible for the recognition and removal of unfolded proteins in the mitochondrial matrix and thereby protects the cell from the accumulation of aggregated proteins in the mitochondrion. However LONP1 is unable to recognise or degrade model aggregated proteins.

For Lon protease-dependent degradation, protein substrates are first recognized and then unfolded if necessary in an ATP-dependent manner. The substrates are subsequently transferred through the pore of complex and into the proteolytic chamber of complex for degradation. ATP binding to the AAA module of the Lon complex results in a change in Lon conformation into a proteolytically active state. In general, Lon protease interacts with peptide regions(sequences) that are located within the hydrophobic core of substrates and rarely on the surface. These regions can be presented to Lon protease when proteins are damaged and lost their conformation integrity. In addition to misfolded proteins, several regulatory proteins can be processed by Lon protease by removing a degradable tag before they fully gain their biological functions.

LONP1 is also a DNA-binding protein that participates in mtDNA maintenance and gene expression regulation. LONP1 degrades mitochondrial transcription factor A (TFAM) when substrate is modified by post-translational modifications (PTMs) such as phosphorylation, regulating mtDNA copy number and metabolism to maintain the TFAM/mtDNA ratio necessary to control replication and transcription.

== Clinical significance and genetic deficiency ==
Given the crucial role of LON protease in maintaining the control of mitochondrial function, its dynamics in expression under stress conditions has been found associating with human diseases and aging. For example, LONP1 expression levels are increased in different tumors and tumor cell lines. Downregulation of LONP1 in some tumor cells causes apoptosis and cell death, indicating a possible addiction of tumor cells to LONP1 function, as occurs with other intracellular proteases associated with cancer. In addition, genetic deficiency of LONP1, caused by biallelic deleterious variants in the LONP1 gene, result in a pattern of severe congenital anomalies called the CODAS syndrome for "Cerebral, ocular, dental, auricular, skeletal anomalies. Thus, LONP1 seems to have important functions in developmental processes that had not been predicted from the previous studies in cell culture models. A study published in 2021 has suggested that genetic variants in LONP1 may be a predisposing factor to the development of congenital diaphragmatic hernia. highlighting yet another role of LONP1 in human embryonic/fetal development.

== See also ==
- Lon protease family
