= Lon protease family =

Family of enzymes

ATP-dependent protease La (LON) domain
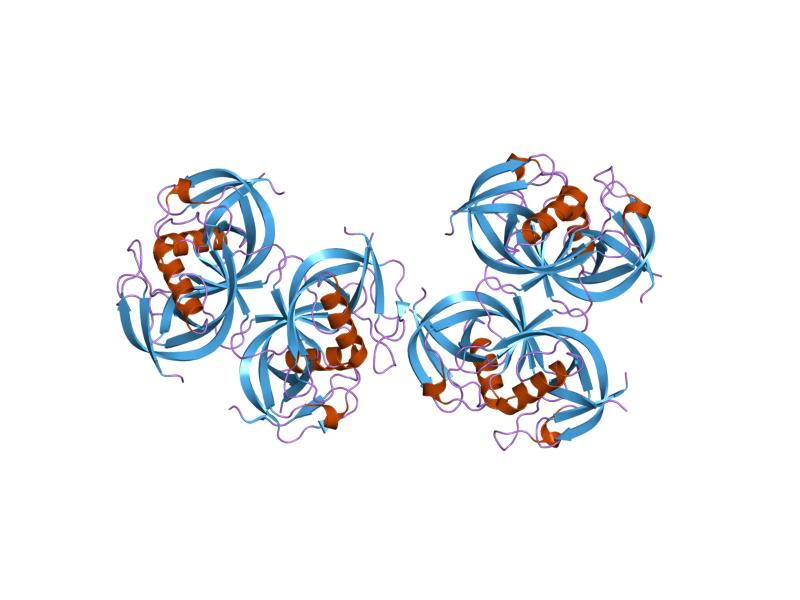
- crystal structure of n-terminal domain of e.coli lon protease

Identifiers
- Symbol: LON
- Pfam: PF02190
- Pfam clan: CL0178
- InterPro: IPR003111
- SMART: LON
- MEROPS: S16
- SCOP2: 1zbo / SCOPe / SUPFAM
Available protein structures:
- PDB: IPR003111 PF02190 (ECOD; PDBsum)
- AlphaFold: IPR003111; PF02190

Lon protease (S16) C-terminal proteolytic domain

Identifiers
- Symbol: LON
- Pfam: PF05362
- Pfam clan: CL0329
- InterPro: IPR008269
- MEROPS: S16
- SCOP2: 1rr9 / SCOPe / SUPFAM
Available protein structures:
- PDB: IPR008269 PF05362 (ECOD; PDBsum)
- AlphaFold: IPR008269; PF05362

In molecular biology, the Lon protease family is a family of enzymes that break peptide bonds in proteins resulting in smaller peptides or amino acids. They are found in archaea, bacteria and eukaryotes. Lon proteases are ATP-dependent serine peptidases belonging to the MEROPS peptidase family S16 (Lon protease family, clan SJ). In the eukaryotes the majority of the Lon proteases are located in the mitochondrial matrix. In yeast, the Lon protease PIM1 is located in the mitochondrial matrix. It is required for mitochondrial function, it is constitutively expressed but is increased after thermal stress, suggesting that PIM1 may play a role in the heat shock response. Lon proteases have two specific subfamilies: LonA and LonB, differentiated by the number of AAA+ domains found in the protein.

== See also ==
- LONP1
