= KATNA1 =

Protein-coding gene in the species Homo sapiens

Identifiers
- Aliases: KATNA1, katanin catalytic subunit A1
- External IDs: OMIM: 606696; MGI: 1344353; GeneCards: KATNA1
Available structures
PDB	Ortholog search: PDBe RCSB
PDB	List of PDB id codes 2RPA
Enzyme activity
EC #	BRENDA	ExPASy	KEGG	MetaCyc
5.6.1.1	↗	↗	↗	↗

Gene location (Human)
Chr.	Chromosome 6 (human)
Band	6q25.1	Start	149,594,873 bp
Band	6q25.1	End	149,648,972 bp

Gene location (Mouse)
Chr.	Chromosome 10 (mouse)
Band	10|10 A1	Start	7,601,764 bp
Band	10|10 A1	End	7,638,914 bp
RNA expression pattern
Bgee	Human / Mouse (ortholog); Top expressed in: sperm; secondary oocyte; gonad; left testis; right testis; Achilles tendon; retinal pigment epithelium; testicle; gastrocnemius muscle; Descending thoracic aorta / Top expressed in: granulocyte; epiblast; bone marrow; zygote; zone of skin; ileum; primary oocyte; thymus; secondary oocyte; esophagus; More reference expression data
BioGPS	n/a
Gene ontology
Molecular function	nucleotide binding; microtubule binding; microtubule-severing ATPase activity; protein binding; protein heterodimerization activity; hydrolase activity; ATP binding; ATPase activity; isomerase activity
Cellular component	cytoplasm; spindle pole; midbody; microtubule; cytoskeleton; nucleus; microtubule organizing center; spindle; mitotic spindle pole; centrosome
Biological process	cell division; microtubule severing; cell cycle; cytoplasmic microtubule organization
Sources:Amigo / QuickGO
Orthologs
Databases	NCBI: entry; OMA: entry
Species	Human	Mouse
Entrez	11104	23924
Ensembl	ENSG00000186625	ENSMUSG00000019794
UniProt	O75449	Q9WV86
RefSeq (mRNA)	NM_001204076; NM_007044	NM_011835
RefSeq (protein)	NP_001191005; NP_008975	n/a
Location (UCSC)	Chr 6: 149.59 – 149.65 Mb	Chr 10: 7.6 – 7.64 Mb
PubMed search
- Wikidata
View/Edit Human	View/Edit Mouse

Katanin p60 ATPase-containing subunit A1 is an enzyme that in humans is encoded by the KATNA1 gene.

Microtubules, polymers of alpha and beta tubulin subunits, form the mitotic spindle of a dividing cell and help to organize membranous organelles during interphase. Katanin is a heterodimer that consists of a 60 kDa ATPase (p60 subunit A 1) and an 80 kDa accessory protein (p80 subunit B 1). The p60 subunit acts to sever and disassemble microtubules, while the p80 subunit targets the enzyme to the centrosome. This gene encodes the p80 subunit. This protein is a member of the AAA family of ATPases.
