= ATAD3B =

Mammalian protein found in humans

Identifiers
- Aliases: ATAD3B, AAA-TOB3, TOB3, ATPase family, AAA domain containing 3B, ATPase family AAA domain containing 3B
- External IDs: OMIM: 612317; GeneCards: ATAD3B

Gene location (Human)
Chr.	Chromosome 1 (human)
Band	1p36.33	Start	1,471,765 bp
Band	1p36.33	End	1,497,848 bp
RNA expression pattern
Bgee	Human / Mouse (ortholog); Top expressed in: anterior pituitary; sural nerve; mucosa of transverse colon; granulocyte; right lobe of thyroid gland; mucosa of ileum; right hemisphere of cerebellum; skin of leg; left ovary; left lobe of thyroid gland / n/a; More reference expression data
BioGPS	n/a
Gene ontology
Molecular function	ATP binding; nucleotide binding; zinc ion binding
Cellular component	membrane; mitochondrial inner membrane; mitochondrion; plasma membrane; secretory granule membrane; ficolin-1-rich granule membrane
Biological process	neutrophil degranulation; mitochondrion organization
Sources:Amigo / QuickGO
Orthologs
Databases	NCBI: entry; OMA: entry
Species	Human	Mouse
Entrez	83858	n/a
Ensembl	ENSG00000160072	n/a
UniProt	Q5T9A4	n/a
RefSeq (mRNA)	NM_031921; NM_001317238	n/a
RefSeq (protein)	NP_001304167; NP_114127	n/a
Location (UCSC)	Chr 1: 1.47 – 1.5 Mb	n/a
PubMed search		n/a
- Wikidata
View/Edit Human

ATAD3B
- Alliases: TOB3, AAA-TOB3, KIAA 1273
- External IDs: NCBI: AAH02542.1

Gene Location (Human)

ATPase family AAA domain-containing protein 3B (or ATAD3B) is a protein that in humans is encoded by the ATAD3B gene. ATAD3 is part of the AAA protein family. The function of ATAD3B is not yet well understood by the scientific community.

== Function ==
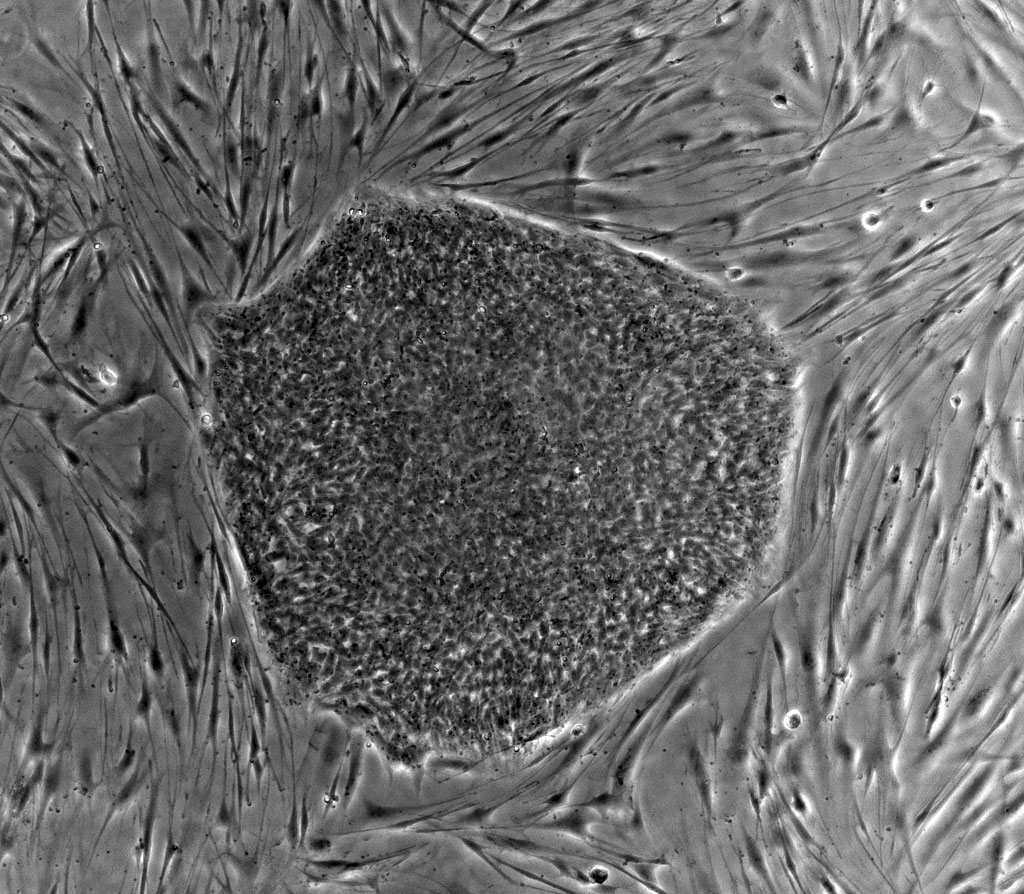
Human embryonic stem cells

ATAD3B is associated with the mitochondria. The C terminus is anchored in the mitochondrial inter membrane space.

The protein is linked with the pluripotency of stem cells. The ATAD3A gene is targeted by c-Myc which is one of four factors needed to create induced pluripotent stem (i-PS) cells from mouse embryonic fibroblasts (MEFs).

Its expression is linked to cell cycle function and tumor growth. When ATAD3B was overexpressed, cell duplication took an extra three hours by spending a longer time in G1 phase.

== Dominant negative activity ==
A mutation in the stop codon means that ATAD3B protein 62 amino acids longer at the C-terminus compared to ATAD3A. This C-terminal extension of ATAD3B turns it into a negative regulator of ATAD3A.

== Clinical significance ==
Abnormal expression levels of ATAD3B has been linked to chemoresistance. Overexpression of ATAD3B was the found to be the strongest factor in breast cancer survival rates.
