= Lon peptidase 2, peroxisomal =

Protein-coding gene in the species Homo sapiens

LONP2

Identifiers
- Aliases: LONP2, LONP, LONPL, lon peptidase 2, peroxisomal, PLON, PSLON
- External IDs: OMIM: 617774; MGI: 1914137; GeneCards: LONP2
Enzyme activity
EC #	BRENDA	ExPASy	KEGG	MetaCyc
3.4.21.53	↗	↗	↗	↗

Gene location (Human)
Chr.	Chromosome 16 (human)
Band	16q12.1	Start	48,244,300 bp
Band	16q12.1	End	48,363,122 bp

Gene location (Mouse)
Chr.	Chromosome 8 (mouse)
Band	8|8 C3	Start	87,350,672 bp
Band	8|8 C3	End	87,450,501 bp
RNA expression pattern
Bgee	Human / Mouse (ortholog); Top expressed in: right uterine tube; right lobe of liver; pituitary gland; anterior pituitary; left lobe of thyroid gland; caput epididymis; right lobe of thyroid gland; left ovary; tibia; right ovary / Top expressed in: left lobe of liver; brown adipose tissue; white adipose tissue; cardiac muscle tissue of left ventricle; dentate gyrus of hippocampal formation granule cell; intercostal muscle; granulocyte; muscle of thigh; interventricular septum; right kidney; More reference expression data
BioGPS	n/a
Gene ontology
Molecular function	nucleotide binding; protease binding; peptidase activity; protein binding; enzyme binding; serine-type peptidase activity; serine-type endopeptidase activity; signaling receptor binding; hydrolase activity; ATP binding; ATP-dependent peptidase activity; ATPase activity
Cellular component	cytoplasm; membrane; peroxisome; peroxisomal matrix; nucleus; cytosol
Biological process	protein targeting to peroxisome; peroxisome organization; response to organic cyclic compound; proteolysis; regulation of fatty acid beta-oxidation; protein catabolic process; protein processing; protein quality control for misfolded or incompletely synthesized proteins; protein import into peroxisome matrix
Sources:Amigo / QuickGO
Orthologs
Databases	NCBI: entry; OMA: entry
Species	Human	Mouse
Entrez	83752	66887
Ensembl	ENSG00000102910	ENSMUSG00000047866
UniProt	Q86WA8	Q9DBN5
RefSeq (mRNA)	NM_001300948; NM_031490; NM_001348078	NM_001168591; NM_025827
RefSeq (protein)	NP_001287877; NP_113678; NP_001335007	NP_001162063; NP_080103
Location (UCSC)	Chr 16: 48.24 – 48.36 Mb	Chr 8: 87.35 – 87.45 Mb
PubMed search
- Wikidata
View/Edit Human	View/Edit Mouse

Lon peptidase 2, peroxisomal is a protein that in humans is encoded by the LONP2 gene.

== Function ==
In human, peroxisomes function primarily to catalyze fatty acid beta-oxidation and, as a by-product, produce hydrogen peroxide and superoxide. The protein encoded by this gene is an ATP-dependent protease that likely plays a role in maintaining overall peroxisome homeostasis as well as proteolytically degrading peroxisomal proteins damaged by oxidation. The protein has an N-terminal Lon N substrate recognition domain, an ATPase domain, a proteolytic domain, and, in some isoforms, a C-terminal peroxisome targeting sequence. Alternative splicing results in multiple transcript variants encoding distinct isoforms. [provided by RefSeq, Jan 2017].
