= TOR3A =

Protein-coding gene in humans

Identifiers
- Aliases: TOR3A, ADIR, ADIR2, torsin family 3 member A
- External IDs: OMIM: 607555; MGI: 1353652; GeneCards: TOR3A

Gene location (Human)
Chr.	Chromosome 1 (human)
Band	1q25.2	Start	179,082,070 bp
Band	1q25.2	End	179,098,023 bp

Gene location (Mouse)
Chr.	Chromosome 1 (mouse)
Band	1|1 G3	Start	156,481,187 bp
Band	1|1 G3	End	156,501,926 bp
RNA expression pattern
Bgee	Human / Mouse (ortholog); Top expressed in: oocyte; granulocyte; lymph node; monocyte; spleen; mucosa of transverse colon; appendix; islet of Langerhans; rectum; epithelium of nasopharynx / Top expressed in: mucous cell of stomach; embryo; conjunctival fornix; calvaria; lip; Paneth cell; mesenteric lymph nodes; islet of Langerhans; right lung lobe; decidua; More reference expression data
BioGPS	n/a
Orthologs
Databases	NCBI: entry; OMA: entry
Species	Human	Mouse
Entrez	64222	30935
Ensembl	ENSG00000186283	ENSMUSG00000060519
UniProt	Q9H497; Q5W0C6	Q9ER38
RefSeq (mRNA)	NM_022371	NM_023141
RefSeq (protein)	NP_071766	NP_075630
Location (UCSC)	Chr 1: 179.08 – 179.1 Mb	Chr 1: 156.48 – 156.5 Mb
PubMed search
- Wikidata
View/Edit Human	View/Edit Mouse

Torsin family 3 member A is a protein that in humans is encoded by the TOR3A gene.
