= CHMP6 =

Protein-coding gene in humans

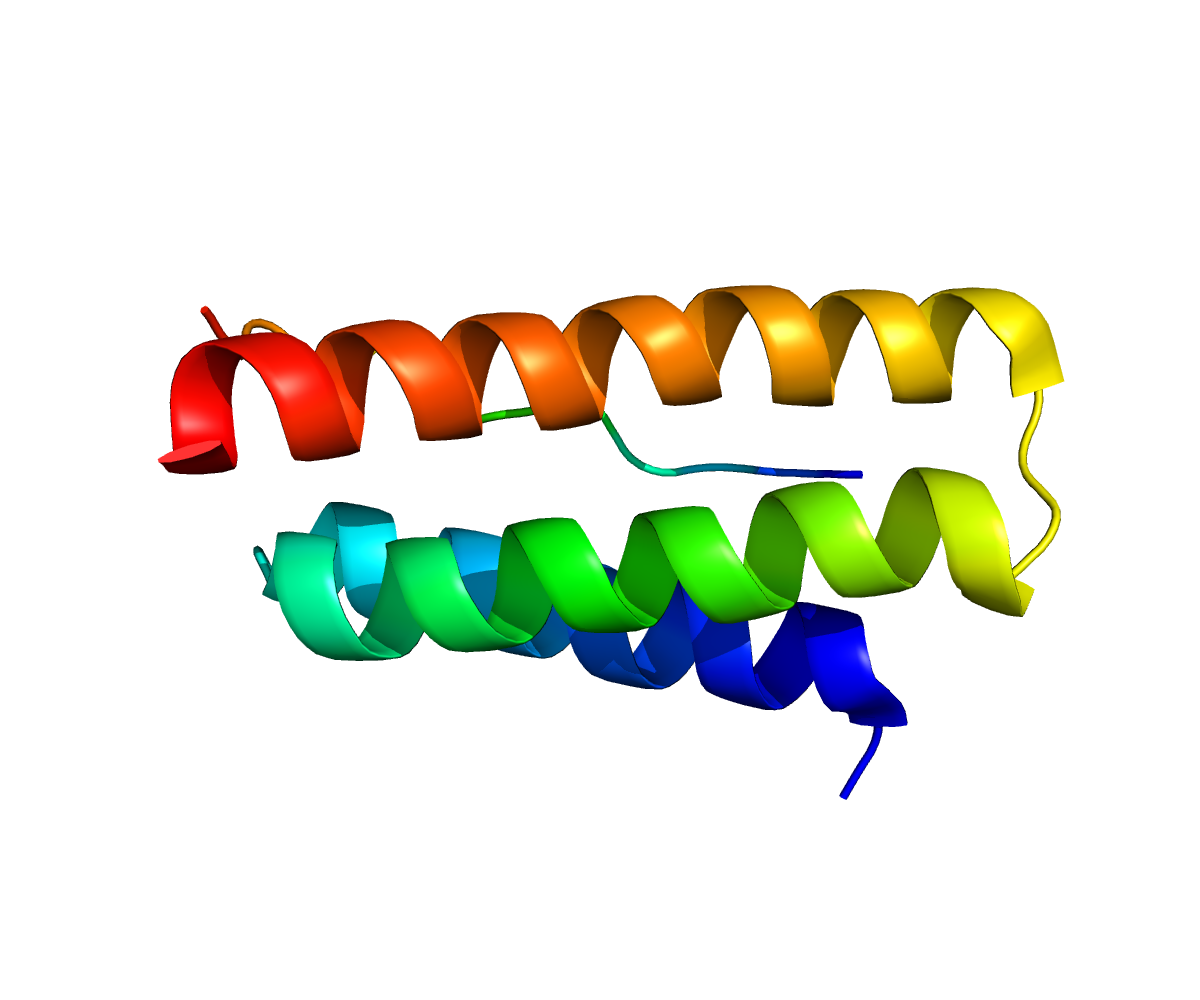

Identifiers
- Aliases: CHMP6, VPS20, charged multivesicular body protein 6
- External IDs: OMIM: 610901; MGI: 3583942; GeneCards: CHMP6
Available structures
PDB	Ortholog search: PDBe RCSB
PDB	List of PDB id codes 2K3W, 3HTU

Gene location (Human)
Chr.	Chromosome 17 (human)
Band	17q25.3	Start	80,991,598 bp
Band	17q25.3	End	81,009,517 bp

Gene location (Mouse)
Chr.	Chromosome 11 (mouse)
Band	11|11 E2	Start	119,804,267 bp
Band	11|11 E2	End	119,810,374 bp
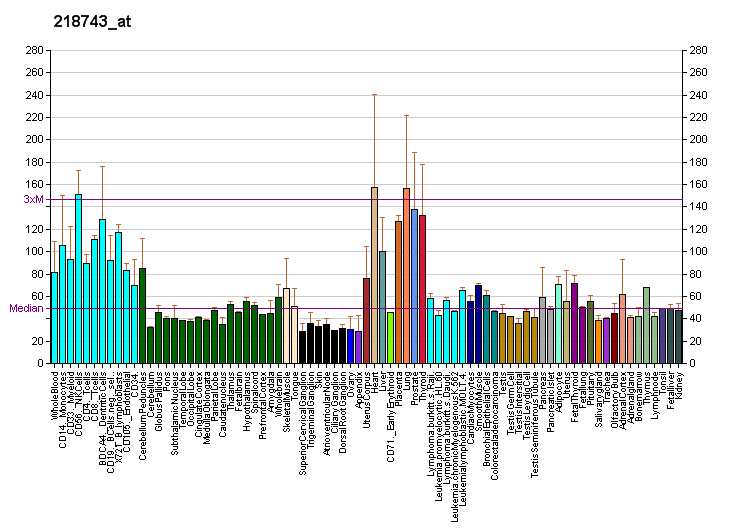
RNA expression pattern
Bgee	Human / Mouse (ortholog); Top expressed in: apex of heart; gastrocnemius muscle; muscle of thigh; mucosa of transverse colon; monocyte; granulocyte; right lobe of liver; sural nerve; stromal cell of endometrium; ectocervix / Top expressed in: right kidney; saccule; otic vesicle; yolk sac; otic placode; spermatocyte; proximal tubule; duodenum; human kidney; lip; More reference expression data
BioGPS	More reference expression data
Gene ontology
Molecular function	protein N-terminus binding; protein binding; protein-containing complex binding
Cellular component	ESCRT III complex; cytosol; endosome; membrane; late endosome membrane; endosome membrane; extracellular exosome; endomembrane system
Biological process	viral life cycle; nucleus organization; regulation of exosomal secretion; multivesicular body assembly; ESCRT III complex assembly; endosomal transport; protein transport; septum digestion after cytokinesis; mitotic metaphase plate congression; vacuolar transport; macroautophagy; negative regulation of epidermal growth factor-activated receptor activity; transport; regulation of protein catabolic process; midbody abscission
Sources:Amigo / QuickGO
Orthologs
Databases	NCBI: entry; OMA: entry
Species	Human	Mouse
Entrez	79643	208092
Ensembl	ENSG00000176108	ENSMUSG00000025371
UniProt	Q96FZ7	P0C0A3
RefSeq (mRNA)	NM_024591	NM_001085498
RefSeq (protein)	NP_078867	NP_001078967
Location (UCSC)	Chr 17: 80.99 – 81.01 Mb	Chr 11: 119.8 – 119.81 Mb
PubMed search
- Wikidata
View/Edit Human	View/Edit Mouse

Charged multivesicular body protein 6 is a protein that in humans is encoded by the CHMP6 gene. It is one of charged multivesicular body proteins and a part of endosomal sorting complexes required for transport-III (ESCRT-III) complex.

== See also ==
- Multivesicular body
