= Microtubule-severing ATPase =

Class of enzymes

microtubule-severing ATPase

Identifiers
- EC no.: 3.6.4.3

Databases
- IntEnz: IntEnz view
- BRENDA: BRENDA entry
- ExPASy: NiceZyme view
- KEGG: KEGG entry
- MetaCyc: metabolic pathway
- PRIAM: profile
- PDB structures: RCSB PDB PDBe PDBsum
- Gene Ontology: AmiGO / QuickGO
Search
- PMC: articles
- PubMed: articles
- NCBI: proteins

In enzymology, a microtubule-severing ATPase (EC 3.6.4.3) is an enzyme that catalyzes the chemical reaction

ATP + H_{2}O $\rightleftharpoons$ ADP + phosphate

Thus, the two substrates of this enzyme are ATP and H_{2}O, whereas its two products are ADP and phosphate.

This enzyme belongs to the family of hydrolases, specifically those acting on acid anhydrides to facilitate cellular and subcellular movement. The systematic name of this enzyme class is ATP phosphohydrolase (tubulin-dimerizing).

== See also ==
- Katanin
