= Torsin-2A =

Protein-coding gene in the species Homo sapiens

TOR2A

Identifiers
- Aliases: TOR2A, TORP1, torsin family 2 member A
- External IDs: OMIM: 608052; MGI: 1353596; GeneCards: TOR2A

Gene location (Human)
Chr.	Chromosome 9 (human)
Band	9q34.11	Start	127,731,524 bp
Band	9q34.11	End	127,735,313 bp

Gene location (Mouse)
Chr.	Chromosome 2 (mouse)
Band	2|2 B	Start	32,757,234 bp
Band	2|2 B	End	32,762,244 bp
RNA expression pattern
Bgee	Human / Mouse (ortholog); Top expressed in: oocyte; granulocyte; monocyte; mucosa of transverse colon; gonad; secondary oocyte; left testis; right testis; blood; spleen / Top expressed in: lacrimal gland; internal carotid artery; external carotid artery; parotid gland; seminal vesicula; lobe of prostate; vas deferens; submandibular gland; fossa; yolk sac; More reference expression data
BioGPS	n/a
Gene ontology
Molecular function	ATP binding; nucleotide binding; ATPase activity; hormone activity
Cellular component	endoplasmic reticulum lumen; endoplasmic reticulum; nuclear envelope; extracellular region
Biological process	protein homooligomerization; chaperone cofactor-dependent protein refolding; antimicrobial humoral immune response mediated by antimicrobial peptide; regulation of signaling receptor activity; positive regulation of gene expression; vasopressin secretion; water homeostasis; positive regulation of calcium ion transmembrane transport; signal transduction
Sources:Amigo / QuickGO
Orthologs
Databases	NCBI: entry; OMA: entry
Species	Human	Mouse
Entrez	27433	30933
Ensembl	ENSG00000160404	ENSMUSG00000009563
UniProt	Q5JU69; Q8N2E6	P0C7W3; Q8R1J9
RefSeq (mRNA)	NM_001085347; NM_001134430; NM_001134431; NM_001252018; NM_001252021 NM_001252023; NM_130459	NM_152800
RefSeq (protein)	NP_001078816; NP_001127902; NP_001127903; NP_001238947; NP_001238950 NP_001238952; NP_569726; NP_001127902.1	NP_690013; NP_001356151; NP_001356152; NP_001356153; NP_001356154
Location (UCSC)	Chr 9: 127.73 – 127.74 Mb	Chr 2: 32.76 – 32.76 Mb
PubMed search
- Wikidata
View/Edit Human	View/Edit Mouse

Torsin-2A is a protein that in humans is encoded by the TOR2A gene.
