= Nucleoside-triphosphatase =

Class of enzymes

nucleoside-triphosphatase
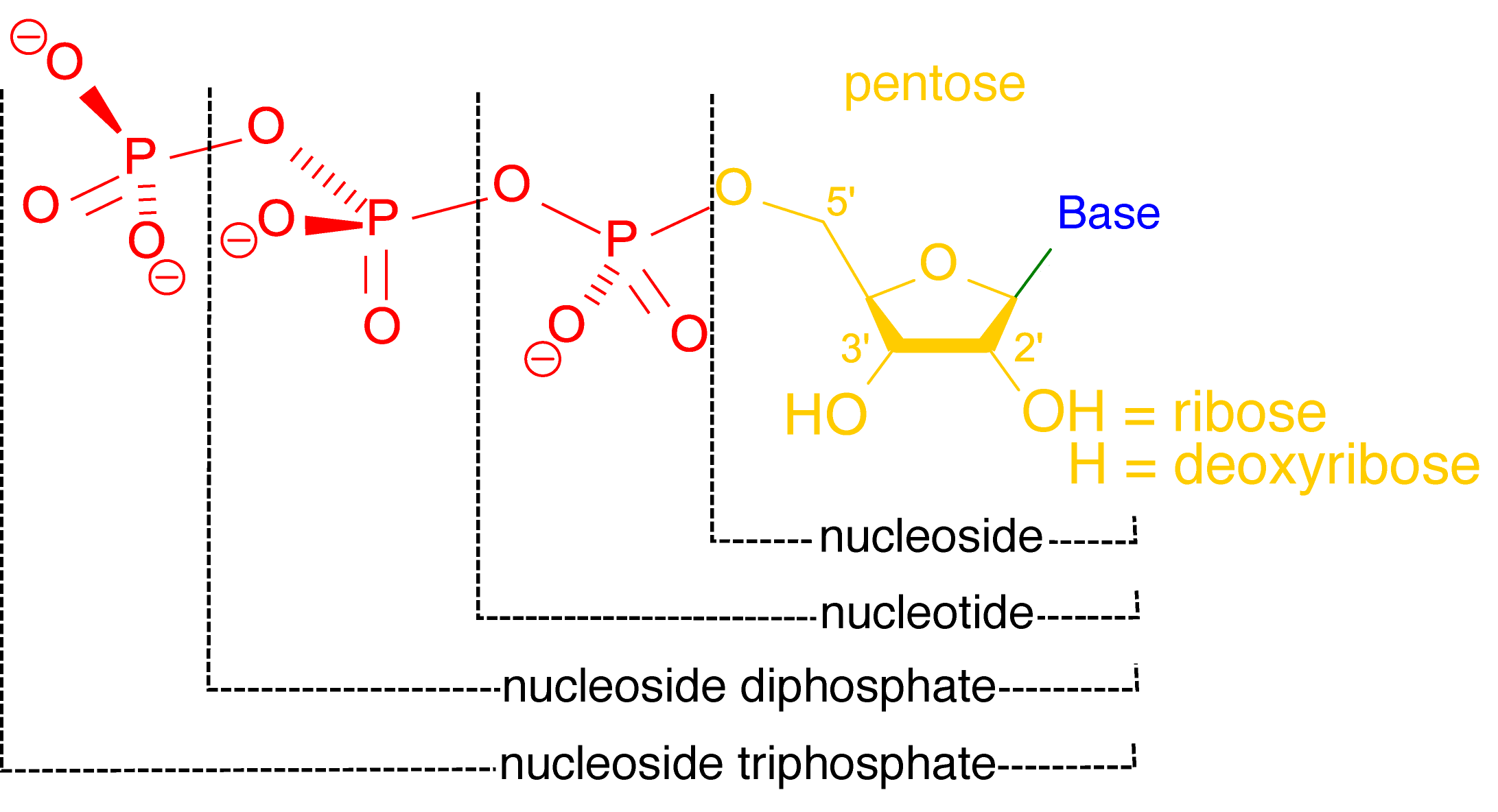

Identifiers
- EC no.: 3.6.1.15
- CAS no.: 9075-51-8

Databases
- BRENDA: enzyme data
- ExPASy: NiceZyme view
- KEGG: enzyme entry
- MetaCyc: metabolic pathway
- Rhea: reactions
- PDB structures: RCSB PDB PDBe PDBsum
- Gene Ontology: AmiGO / QuickGO
Search
- PMC: articles
- PubMed: articles
- NCBI: proteins

Nucleoside-triphosphatase (NTPase) (EC 3.6.1.15) is an enzyme characterised from mammalian liver and pea seedlings that catalyzes a general hydrolysis reaction:

nucleoside triphosphate + H_{2}O $\rightleftharpoons$ nucleoside diphosphate + phosphate

For example, the enzyme converts adenosine triphosphate to adenosine diphosphate:

adenosine triphosphate
H_{2}O
P_{i}
adenosine diphosphate

The enzyme is also found in the bacterium Aquifex aeolicus, and has been implicated in human cancers.

This enzyme is a hydrolase, one acting on acid anhydrides in phosphorus-containing anhydrides. The systematic name of this enzyme class is unspecific diphosphate phosphohydrolase. Other names in common use include nucleoside triphosphate phosphohydrolase, nucleoside-5-triphosphate phosphohydrolase, and nucleoside 5-triphosphatase.

== Structural studies ==
As of late 2007, only one structure has been solved for this class of enzymes, with the PDB accession code PDB: 2I3B.
