= VPS4A =

Protein-coding gene in the species Homo sapiens

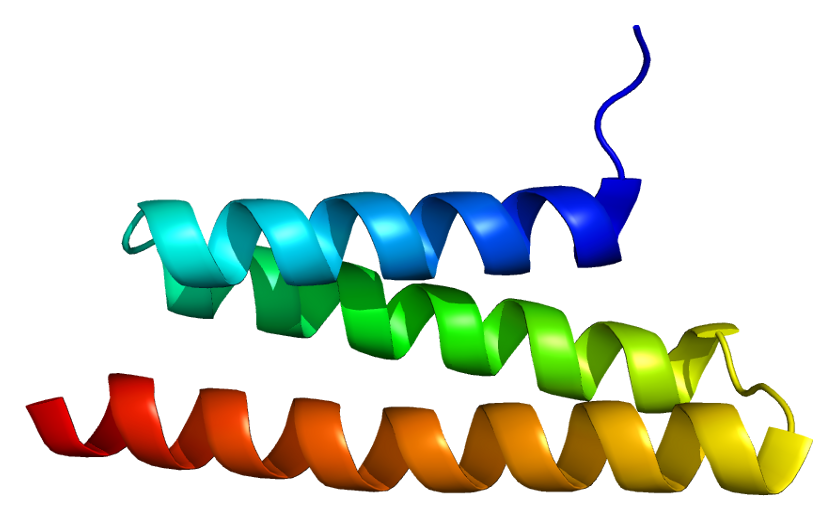

Identifiers
- Aliases: VPS4A, SKD1, SKD1A, SKD2, VPS4, VPS4-1, vacuolar protein sorting 4 homolog A, CIMDAG
- External IDs: OMIM: 609982; MGI: 1890520; GeneCards: VPS4A
Available structures
PDB	Ortholog search: PDBe RCSB
PDB	List of PDB id codes 1YXR, 2JQ9, 2K3W
Enzyme activity
EC #	BRENDA	ExPASy	KEGG	MetaCyc
3.6.4.6	↗	↗	↗	↗

Gene location (Human)
Chr.	Chromosome 16 (human)
Band	16q22.1	Start	69,311,350 bp
Band	16q22.1	End	69,326,939 bp

Gene location (Mouse)
Chr.	Chromosome 8 (mouse)
Band	8|8 D3	Start	107,757,854 bp
Band	8|8 D3	End	107,772,387 bp
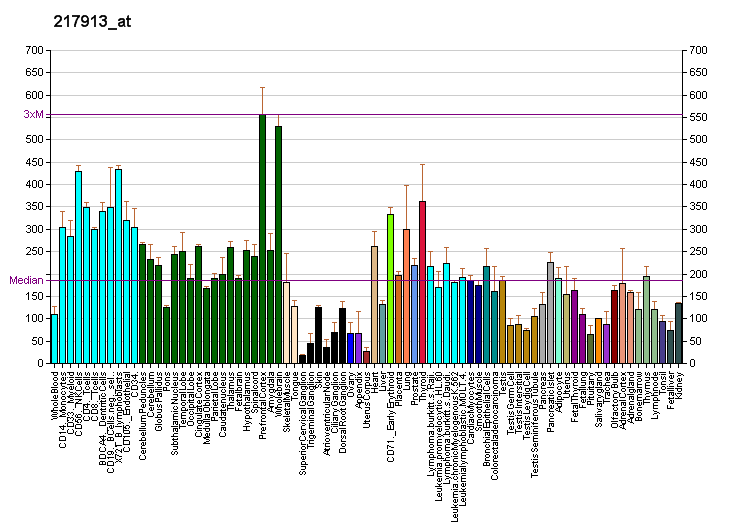
RNA expression pattern
Bgee	Human / Mouse (ortholog); Top expressed in: gastrocnemius muscle; cerebellar vermis; muscle of thigh; Skeletal muscle tissue of rectus abdominis; parotid gland; apex of heart; Brodmann area 23; middle temporal gyrus; right frontal lobe; endothelial cell / Top expressed in: spermatid; spermatocyte; seminiferous tubule; neural layer of retina; dentate gyrus of hippocampal formation granule cell; dorsal tegmental nucleus; superior colliculus; pontine nuclei; medial dorsal nucleus; primary visual cortex; More reference expression data
BioGPS	More reference expression data
Gene ontology
Molecular function	nucleotide binding; protein domain specific binding; microtubule-severing ATPase activity; protein C-terminus binding; protein binding; hydrolase activity; ATP binding; ATPase activity; protein-containing complex binding
Cellular component	cytoplasm; ESCRT III complex; cytosol; endosome; late endosome; centrosome; spindle pole; vacuolar membrane; late endosome membrane; Flemming body; membrane; plasma membrane; midbody; early endosome; perinuclear region of cytoplasm; lysosome; extracellular exosome; nucleus; endosome membrane
Biological process	late endosomal microautophagy; endosomal vesicle fusion; viral release from host cell; abscission; viral budding via host ESCRT complex; nucleus organization; viral life cycle; multivesicular body assembly; vacuole organization; vesicle uncoating; regulation of protein localization; cell division; intracellular cholesterol transport; ESCRT complex disassembly; vesicle budding from membrane; ubiquitin-independent protein catabolic process via the multivesicular body sorting pathway; transport; protein transport; positive regulation of viral life cycle; ubiquitin-dependent protein catabolic process via the multivesicular body sorting pathway; cell cycle; negative regulation of cytokinesis; septum digestion after cytokinesis; mitotic metaphase plate congression; positive regulation of exosomal secretion; vesicle-mediated transport; regulation of protein localization to plasma membrane; ESCRT III complex disassembly; cytoplasmic microtubule organization; endosomal transport; macroautophagy; positive regulation of viral budding via host ESCRT complex; actomyosin contractile ring contraction; protein targeting to lysosome; nuclear envelope organization; nuclear membrane reassembly; mitotic cytokinesis checkpoint signaling; cytoskeleton-dependent cytokinesis; midbody abscission
Sources:Amigo / QuickGO
Orthologs
Databases	NCBI: entry; OMA: entry
Species	Human	Mouse
Entrez	27183	116733
Ensembl	ENSG00000132612	ENSMUSG00000031913
UniProt	Q9UN37	Q8VEJ9
RefSeq (mRNA)	NM_013245	NM_126165
RefSeq (protein)	NP_037377; NP_037377.1	NP_569053
Location (UCSC)	Chr 16: 69.31 – 69.33 Mb	Chr 8: 107.76 – 107.77 Mb
PubMed search
- Wikidata
View/Edit Human	View/Edit Mouse

Vacuolar protein sorting-associated protein 4A is a protein that in humans is encoded by the VPS4A gene.

== Function ==
The protein encoded by this gene is a member of the AAA protein family (ATPases associated with diverse cellular activities), and is the homolog of the yeast Vps4 protein. In humans, two paralogs of the yeast protein have been identified. They share a high degree of amino acid sequence similarity with each other, and also with yeast Vps4 and mouse proteins. Functional studies indicate that both human paralogs associate with the endosomal compartments, and are involved in intracellular protein trafficking, similar to Vps4 protein in yeast. The gene encoding this paralog has been mapped to chromosome 16; the gene for the other resides on chromosome 18.

== Interactions ==
VPS4A has been shown to interact with CHMP1A.
