= PSME4 =

Protein found in humans

Identifiers
- Aliases: PSME4, PA200, proteasome activator subunit 4
- External IDs: OMIM: 607705; MGI: 2143994; GeneCards: PSME4

Gene location (Human)
Chr.	Chromosome 2 (human)
Band	2p16.2	Start	53,864,069 bp
Band	2p16.2	End	53,970,993 bp

Gene location (Mouse)
Chr.	Chromosome 11 (mouse)
Band	11|11 A4	Start	30,721,726 bp
Band	11|11 A4	End	30,830,361 bp
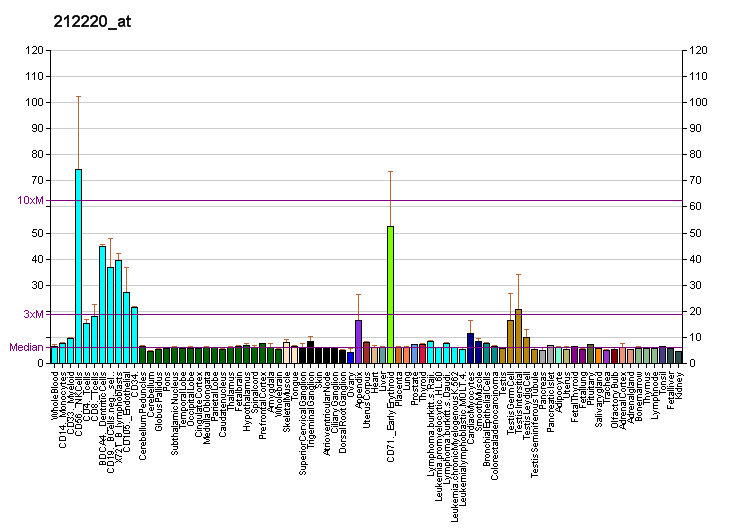

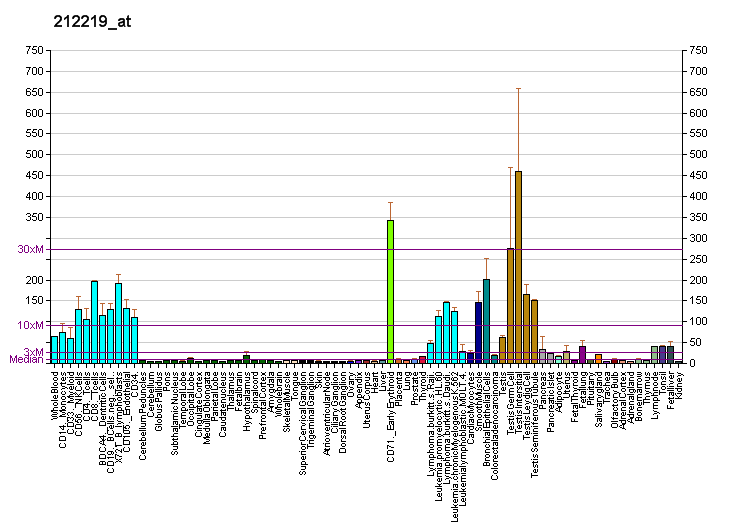

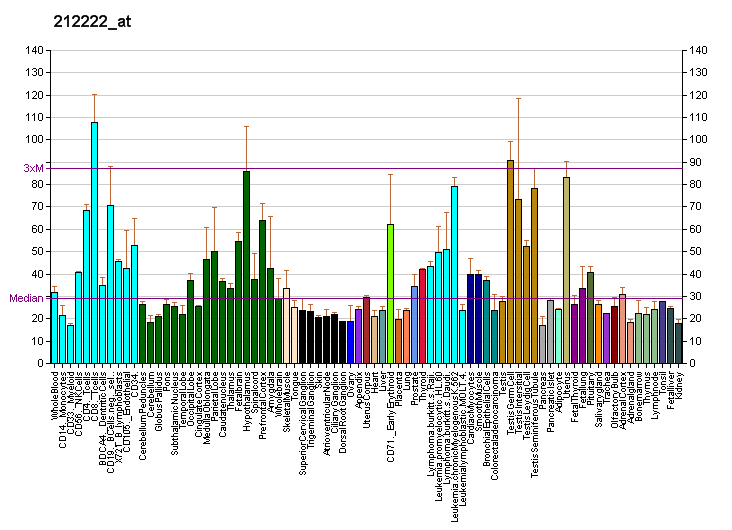
RNA expression pattern
Bgee	Human / Mouse (ortholog); Top expressed in: sperm; glutes; gastrocnemius muscle; left testis; biceps brachii; right testis; Skeletal muscle tissue of biceps brachii; deltoid muscle; triceps brachii muscle; vastus lateralis muscle / Top expressed in: temporal muscle; triceps brachii muscle; vastus lateralis muscle; sternocleidomastoid muscle; digastric muscle; myocardium of ventricle; gastrocnemius muscle; spermatid; medial head of gastrocnemius muscle; cardiac muscles; More reference expression data
BioGPS	More reference expression data
Gene ontology
Molecular function	protein binding; peptidase activator activity; lysine-acetylated histone binding; proteasome binding
Cellular component	cytoplasm; nuclear speck; proteasome complex; nucleus; nucleoplasm; cytosol; proteasome core complex; spermatoproteasome complex
Biological process	cell differentiation; regulation of cellular amino acid metabolic process; antigen processing and presentation of exogenous peptide antigen via MHC class I, TAP-dependent; regulation of mRNA stability; positive regulation of canonical Wnt signaling pathway; protein polyubiquitination; stimulatory C-type lectin receptor signaling pathway; tumor necrosis factor-mediated signaling pathway; MAPK cascade; cellular response to DNA damage stimulus; positive regulation of peptidase activity; multicellular organism development; Fc-epsilon receptor signaling pathway; NIK/NF-kappaB signaling; spermatogenesis; anaphase-promoting complex-dependent catabolic process; T cell receptor signaling pathway; negative regulation of canonical Wnt signaling pathway; DNA repair; proteasome-mediated ubiquitin-dependent protein catabolic process; Wnt signaling pathway, planar cell polarity pathway; proteasomal ubiquitin-independent protein catabolic process; negative regulation of G2/M transition of mitotic cell cycle; protein deubiquitination; SCF-dependent proteasomal ubiquitin-dependent protein catabolic process; transmembrane transport; regulation of transcription from RNA polymerase II promoter in response to hypoxia; post-translational protein modification; regulation of hematopoietic stem cell differentiation; interleukin-1-mediated signaling pathway; regulation of mitotic cell cycle phase transition
Sources:Amigo / QuickGO
Orthologs
Databases	NCBI: entry; OMA: entry
Species	Human	Mouse
Entrez	23198	103554
Ensembl	ENSG00000068878	ENSMUSG00000040850
UniProt	Q14997	Q5SSW2
RefSeq (mRNA)	NM_014614	NM_134013
RefSeq (protein)	NP_055429	NP_598774
Location (UCSC)	Chr 2: 53.86 – 53.97 Mb	Chr 11: 30.72 – 30.83 Mb
PubMed search
- Wikidata
View/Edit Human	View/Edit Mouse

Proteasome activator complex subunit 4 is a protein that in humans is encoded by the PSME4 gene.
