= AFG3L2 =

Protein-coding gene in the species Homo sapiens

Identifiers
- Aliases: AFG3L2, SCA28, SPAX5, AFG3 like matrix AAA peptidase subunit 2, OPA12
- External IDs: OMIM: 604581; MGI: 1916847; GeneCards: AFG3L2
Available structures
| PDB | Ortholog search: PDBe RCSB |
| PDB | List of PDB id codes 2LNA |

Gene location (Human)
| Chr. | Chromosome 18 (human) |
| Band | 18p11.21 | Start | 12,328,944 bp |
| Band | 18p11.21 | End | 12,377,227 bp |

Gene location (Mouse)
| Chr. | Chromosome 18 (mouse) |
| Band | 18|18 E1 | Start | 67,537,834 bp |
| Band | 18|18 E1 | End | 67,582,242 bp |
RNA expression pattern
| Bgee | Human / Mouse (ortholog); Top expressed in: Brodmann area 23; endothelial cell; jejunal mucosa; parietal pleura; Skeletal muscle tissue of biceps brachii; renal medulla; gingival epithelium; right ventricle; germinal epithelium; tibia / Top expressed in: interventricular septum; muscle of thigh; right kidney; zygote; proximal tubule; myocardium of ventricle; secondary oocyte; gastrula; otic vesicle; skeletal muscle tissue; More reference expression data |
| BioGPS | n/a |
Gene ontology
| Molecular function | nucleotide binding; unfolded protein binding; zinc ion binding; metal ion binding; peptidase activity; protein binding; metalloendopeptidase activity; hydrolase activity; ATP binding; metallopeptidase activity |
| Cellular component | integral component of membrane; membrane; mitochondrion; m-AAA complex; mitochondrial inner membrane |
| Biological process | regulation of multicellular organism growth; mitochondrion organization; neuromuscular junction development; myelination; righting reflex; proteolysis; axonogenesis; calcium import into the mitochondrion; mitochondrial calcium ion homeostasis; mitochondrial fusion; nerve development; mitochondrial protein processing; cristae formation; mitochondrial calcium ion transmembrane transport; protein processing; protein autoprocessing |
Sources:Amigo / QuickGO
Orthologs
| Databases | NCBI: entry; OMA: entry |
| Species | Human | Mouse |
| Entrez | 10939 | 69597 |
| Ensembl | ENSG00000141385 | ENSMUSG00000024527 |
| UniProt | Q9Y4W6 | Q8JZQ2 |
| RefSeq (mRNA) | NM_006796 | NM_027130 |
| RefSeq (protein) | NP_006787 | NP_081406 |
| Location (UCSC) | Chr 18: 12.33 – 12.38 Mb | Chr 18: 67.54 – 67.58 Mb |
| PubMed search |
- Wikidata
| View/Edit Human | View/Edit Mouse |

AFG3 ATPase family gene 3-like 2 (S. cerevisiae) is a protein that in humans is encoded by the AFG3L2 gene.

This gene encodes a protein localized in mitochondria and closely related to paraplegin. The paraplegin gene is responsible for an autosomal recessive form of hereditary spastic paraplegia. This gene is a candidate gene for other hereditary spastic paraplegias or neurodegenerative disorders as well as spastic ataxia-neuropathy syndrome.
