= CHMP5 =

Protein-coding gene in humans

Identifiers
- Aliases: CHMP5, C9orf83, HSPC177, PNAS-2, SNF7DC2, Vps60, CGI-34, charged multivesicular body protein 5
- External IDs: OMIM: 610900; MGI: 1924209; GeneCards: CHMP5
Available structures
| PDB | Ortholog search: PDBe RCSB |
| PDB | List of PDB id codes 2LXM, 3ULY, 3UM0, 3UM1, 3UM2, 4TXR |

Gene location (Mouse)
| Chr. | Chromosome 4 (mouse) |
| Band | 4|4 A5 | Start | 40,948,407 bp |
| Band | 4|4 A5 | End | 40,965,303 bp |
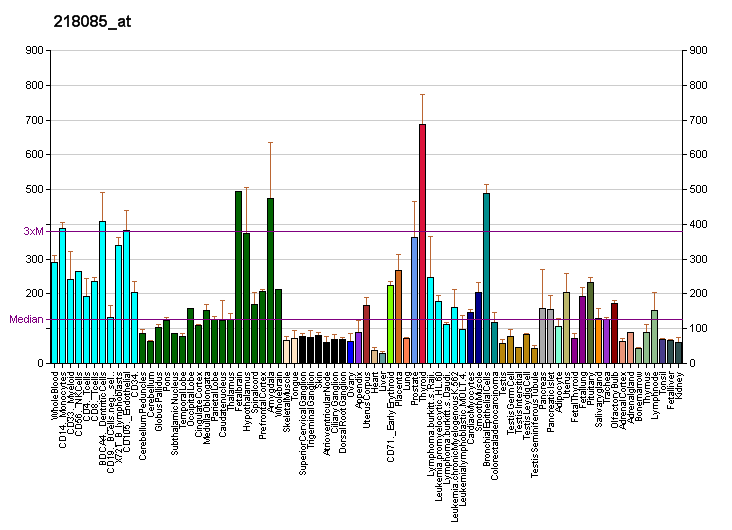

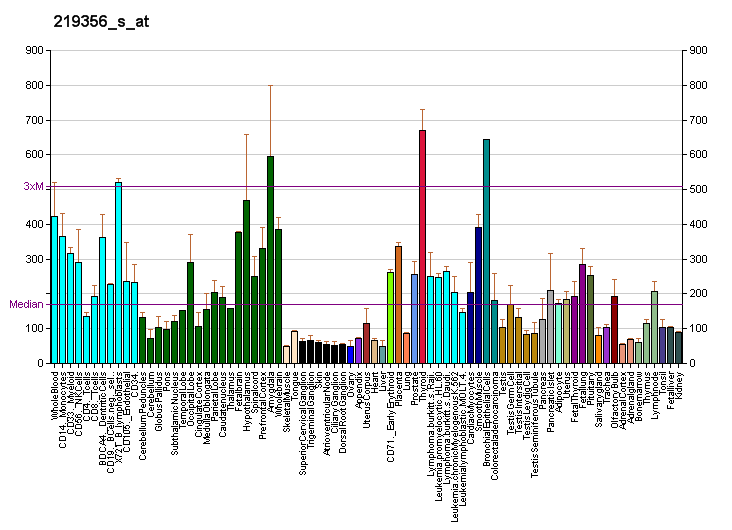
RNA expression pattern
| Bgee | Human / Mouse (ortholog); Top expressed in: germinal epithelium; palpebral conjunctiva; amniotic fluid; visceral pleura; sperm; parietal pleura; bronchial epithelial cell; endothelial cell; jejunal mucosa; glomerulus / Top expressed in: transitional epithelium of urinary bladder; right lung lobe; vestibular membrane of cochlear duct; pineal gland; superior cervical ganglion; facial motor nucleus; medial ganglionic eminence; conjunctival fornix; anterior horn of spinal cord; gastric mucosa; More reference expression data |
| BioGPS | More reference expression data |
Gene ontology
| Molecular function | protein binding; cadherin binding |
| Cellular component | cytoplasm; cytosol; endosome; membrane; endosome membrane; extracellular exosome; nucleus |
| Biological process | regulation of centrosome duplication; viral life cycle; nucleus organization; multivesicular body sorting pathway; endosome to lysosome transport; multivesicular body assembly; regulation of mitotic spindle assembly; endosomal transport; protein transport; septum digestion after cytokinesis; mitotic metaphase plate congression; regulation of receptor recycling; lysosome organization; vacuolar transport; ESCRT III complex disassembly; transport; midbody abscission; cellular response to lipopolysaccharide; cellular response to muramyl dipeptide |
Sources:Amigo / QuickGO
Orthologs
| Databases | NCBI: entry |
| Species | Human | Mouse |
| Entrez | 51510 | 76959 |
| Ensembl | n/a | ENSMUSG00000028419 |
| UniProt | Q9NZZ3 | Q9D7S9 |
| RefSeq (mRNA) | NM_016410; NM_001195536 | NM_029814 |
| RefSeq (protein) | NP_001182465; NP_057494 | NP_084090 |
| Location (UCSC) | n/a | Chr 4: 40.95 – 40.97 Mb |
| PubMed search |
- Wikidata
| View/Edit Human | View/Edit Mouse |

Charged multivesicular body protein 5 is a protein that in humans is encoded by the CHMP5 gene.

== Function ==
CHMP5 belongs to the chromatin-modifying protein/charged multivesicular body protein (CHMP) family. These proteins are components of ESCRT-III (endosomal sorting complex required for transport III), a complex involved in degradation of surface receptor proteins and formation of endocytic multivesicular bodies (MVBs). Some CHMPs have both nuclear and cytoplasmic/vesicular distributions, and one such CHMP, CHMP1A, is required for both MVB formation and regulation of cell cycle progression.
