= CHMP2A =

Protein-coding gene in humans

Identifiers
- Aliases: CHMP2A, BC-2, BC2, CHMP2, VPS2, VPS2A, charged multivesicular body protein 2A
- External IDs: OMIM: 610893; MGI: 1916203; GeneCards: CHMP2A

Gene location (Human)
Chr.	Chromosome 19 (human)
Band	19q13.43	Start	58,551,452 bp
Band	19q13.43	End	58,555,105 bp

Gene location (Mouse)
Chr.	Chromosome 7 (mouse)
Band	7 A1|7	Start	12,765,937 bp
Band	7 A1|7	End	12,768,734 bp
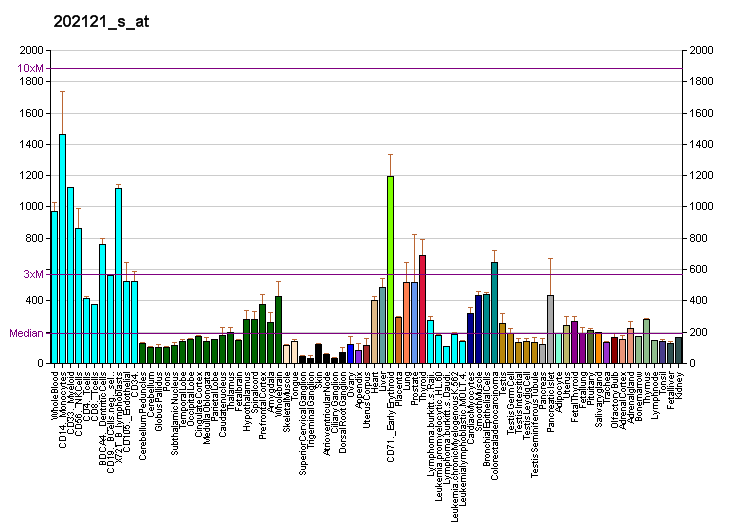
RNA expression pattern
Bgee	Human / Mouse (ortholog); Top expressed in: mucosa of transverse colon; right adrenal gland; right adrenal cortex; left adrenal gland; left adrenal cortex; oral cavity; olfactory zone of nasal mucosa; skin of leg; apex of heart; gastric mucosa / Top expressed in: corneal stroma; saccule; seminal vesicula; superior surface of tongue; arcuate nucleus; olfactory epithelium; neural layer of retina; left colon; otic vesicle; skin of external ear; More reference expression data
BioGPS	More reference expression data
Gene ontology
Molecular function	protein domain specific binding; phosphatidylcholine binding; protein binding
Cellular component	cytosol; endosome; membrane; late endosome membrane; membrane coat; extracellular exosome; ESCRT III complex; nuclear envelope; chromatin; multivesicular body
Biological process	regulation of centrosome duplication; protein polymerization; viral budding via host ESCRT complex; protein heterooligomerization; nucleus organization; viral life cycle; establishment of protein localization; negative regulation of centriole elongation; membrane invagination; multivesicular body assembly; negative regulation of cell death; regulation of mitotic spindle assembly; endosomal transport; transport; protein transport; positive regulation of exosomal secretion; septum digestion after cytokinesis; mitotic metaphase plate congression; protein homooligomerization; vacuolar transport; regulation of viral process; ESCRT III complex disassembly; nuclear membrane reassembly; exit from mitosis; macroautophagy; endosome transport via multivesicular body sorting pathway; late endosome to vacuole transport; midbody abscission
Sources:Amigo / QuickGO
Orthologs
Databases	NCBI: entry; OMA: entry
Species	Human	Mouse
Entrez	27243	68953
Ensembl	ENSG00000130724	ENSMUSG00000033916
UniProt	O43633	Q9DB34
RefSeq (mRNA)	NM_014453; NM_198426	NM_026885; NM_001360730; NM_001360731; NM_001360733
RefSeq (protein)	NP_055268; NP_940818	NP_081161; NP_001347659; NP_001347660; NP_001347662
Location (UCSC)	Chr 19: 58.55 – 58.56 Mb	Chr 7: 12.77 – 12.77 Mb
PubMed search
- Wikidata
View/Edit Human	View/Edit Mouse

Charged multivesicular body protein 2a is a protein that in humans is encoded by the CHMP2A gene. It is a reference gene.
