= Fidgetin-like 2 =

FIGNL2

Identifiers
- Aliases: FIGNL2, fidgetin like 2
- External IDs: MGI: 3646919; GeneCards: FIGNL2

Gene location (Human)
Chr.	Chromosome 12 (human)
Band	12q13.13	Start	51,817,899 bp
Band	12q13.13	End	51,848,718 bp

Gene location (Mouse)
Chr.	Chromosome 15 (mouse)
Band	15|15 F1	Start	100,948,075 bp
Band	15|15 F1	End	100,976,448 bp
RNA expression pattern
Bgee	Human / Mouse (ortholog); Top expressed in: human kidney; ventricular zone; right hemisphere of cerebellum; pituitary gland; sural nerve; right lobe of liver; anterior pituitary; stromal cell of endometrium; granulocyte; placenta / Top expressed in: tail of embryo; placenta; yolk sac; epiblast; genital tubercle; lens; human kidney; urinary bladder; white adipose tissue; adrenal gland; More reference expression data
BioGPS	n/a
Gene ontology
Molecular function	ATP binding; nucleotide binding; ATPase activity; microtubule-severing ATPase activity
Cellular component	nucleus
Biological process	regulation of double-strand break repair via homologous recombination; cytoplasmic microtubule organization; microtubule severing
Sources:Amigo / QuickGO
Orthologs
Databases	NCBI: entry; OMA: entry
Species	Human	Mouse
Entrez	401720	668225
Ensembl	ENSG00000261308	ENSMUSG00000095440
UniProt	A6NMB9	J3QK54
RefSeq (mRNA)	NM_001013690; NM_001384995; NM_001384996	NM_001214911
RefSeq (protein)	NP_001013712	NP_001201840
Location (UCSC)	Chr 12: 51.82 – 51.85 Mb	Chr 15: 100.95 – 100.98 Mb
PubMed search
- Wikidata
View/Edit Human	View/Edit Mouse

Fidgetin-like 2 (FL2) is an enzyme which in humans is encoded by the gene FIGNL2. FL2 slows the rate at which skin cells migrate to wounds to heal them. If this enzyme is suppressed/absent, skin cells move faster, speeding the healing process. FL2 is closely related to another protein called fidgetin (encoded by FIGN in humans), which severs microtubules.

== Delivery ==
Molecules of silencing RNA (siRNA) that bind to a gene's messenger RNA (mRNA) can inhibit the production of FL2, but siRNAs require protection from degradation in order to reach a wound site.

In 2015, researchers disclosed the successful use of nanoparticles to ferry siRNA molecules to their intended targets, reducing healing times in mice with skin excisions or burns. The result was normal, well-orchestrated tissue, including hair follicles and supportive collagen network.
