= CHMP2B =

Protein-coding gene in humans

Identifiers
- Aliases: CHMP2B, ALS17, CHMP2.5, DMT1, VPS2-2, VPS2B, charged multivesicular body protein 2B, FTDALS7
- External IDs: OMIM: 609512; MGI: 1916192; GeneCards: CHMP2B
Available structures
PDB	Ortholog search: PDBe RCSB
PDB	List of PDB id codes 2JQK

Gene location (Human)
Chr.	Chromosome 3 (human)
Band	3p11.2	Start	87,227,271 bp
Band	3p11.2	End	87,255,556 bp

Gene location (Mouse)
Chr.	Chromosome 16 (mouse)
Band	16|16 C1.3	Start	65,336,014 bp
Band	16|16 C1.3	End	65,359,612 bp
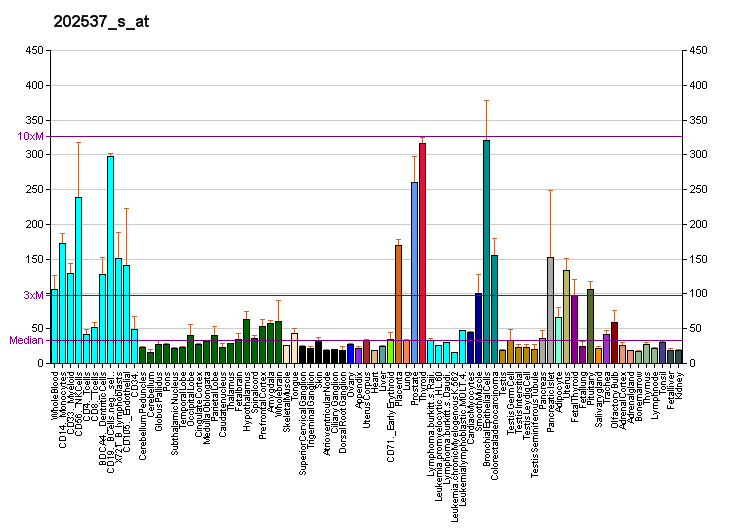

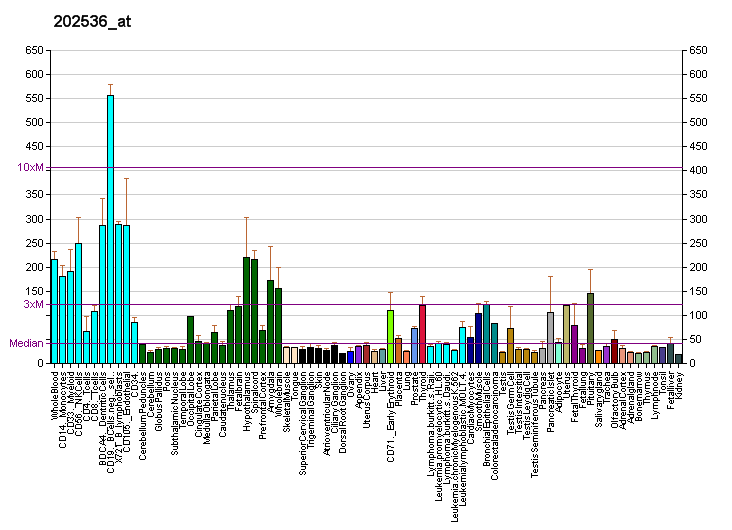

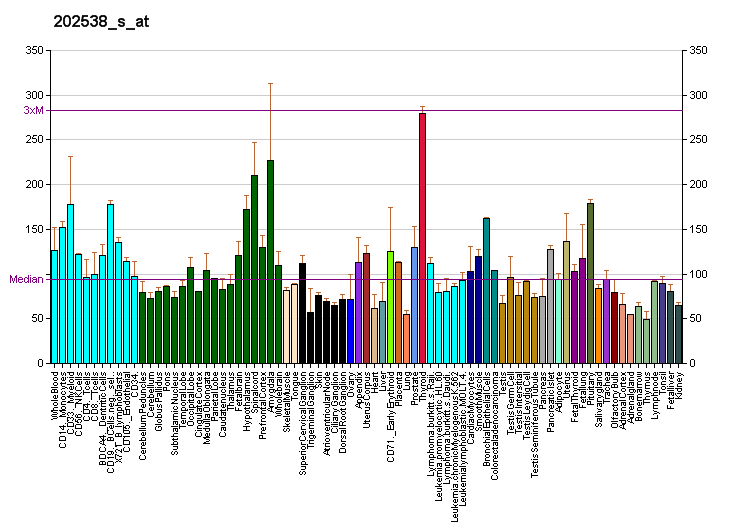
RNA expression pattern
Bgee	Human / Mouse (ortholog); Top expressed in: internal globus pallidus; amniotic fluid; mucosa of sigmoid colon; jejunal mucosa; palpebral conjunctiva; pons; oocyte; secondary oocyte; subthalamic nucleus; germinal epithelium / Top expressed in: spermatocyte; lobe of prostate; otolith organ; utricle; jejunum; gastrula; spermatid; migratory enteric neural crest cell; decidua; left colon; More reference expression data
BioGPS	More reference expression data
Gene ontology
Molecular function	protein domain specific binding; protein binding; cadherin binding
Cellular component	cytoplasm; ESCRT III complex; cytosol; endosome; late endosome; late endosome membrane; membrane; plasma membrane; intracellular anatomical structure; lysosome; extracellular exosome; multivesicular body; postsynaptic density; glutamatergic synapse
Biological process	regulation of centrosome duplication; cognition; nucleus organization; viral life cycle; neuron cellular homeostasis; multivesicular body assembly; regulation of mitotic spindle assembly; endosome organization; autophagy; endosomal transport; protein transport; septum digestion after cytokinesis; mitotic metaphase plate congression; vacuolar transport; ESCRT III complex disassembly; macroautophagy; multivesicular body-lysosome fusion; transport; viral budding via host ESCRT complex; endosome transport via multivesicular body sorting pathway; late endosome to vacuole transport; midbody abscission; regulation of modification of postsynaptic structure; regulation of postsynapse organization
Sources:Amigo / QuickGO
Orthologs
Databases	NCBI: entry; OMA: entry
Species	Human	Mouse
Entrez	25978	68942
Ensembl	ENSG00000083937	ENSMUSG00000004843
UniProt	Q9UQN3	Q8BJF9
RefSeq (mRNA)	NM_001244644; NM_014043	NM_026879
RefSeq (protein)	NP_001231573; NP_054762	NP_081155
Location (UCSC)	Chr 3: 87.23 – 87.26 Mb	Chr 16: 65.34 – 65.36 Mb
PubMed search
- Wikidata
View/Edit Human	View/Edit Mouse

Charged multivesicular body protein 2b is a protein that in humans is encoded by the CHMP2B gene. It forms part of one of the endosomal sorting complexes required for transport (ESCRT) - specifically ESCRT-III - which are a series of complexes involved in cell membrane remodelling. CHMP2B forms long chains that spiral around the neck of a budding vesicle. Along with the other components of ESCRT-III, CHMP2B constricts the neck of the vesicle just before it is cleaved away from the membrane.

Mutations of this gene cause chromosome 3-linked frontotemporal dementia (FTD3), which has been described in several members of one Danish family . In a study of French families with several forms of frontotemporal dementia, it was found to be a relatively rare cause.
