= CHMP1B =

Protein-coding gene in humans

Identifiers
- Aliases: CHMP1B, C10orf2, C18-ORF2, C18orf2, CHMP1.5, Vps46-2, Vps46B, hVps46-2, charged multivesicular body protein 1B
- External IDs: OMIM: 606486; MGI: 1914314; GeneCards: CHMP1B
Available structures
| PDB | Ortholog search: PDBe RCSB |
| PDB | List of PDB id codes 3EAB, 4TXQ, 4TXR, 3JC1 |

Gene location (Human)
| Chr. | Chromosome 18 (human) |
| Band | 18p11.21 | Start | 11,851,413 bp |
| Band | 18p11.21 | End | 11,854,444 bp |

Gene location (Mouse)
| Chr. | Chromosome 18 (mouse) |
| Band | 18|18 E1 | Start | 67,338,437 bp |
| Band | 18|18 E1 | End | 67,340,960 bp |
RNA expression pattern
| Bgee | Human / Mouse (ortholog); Top expressed in: gastrocnemius muscle; beta cell; tibialis anterior muscle; muscle of thigh; glutes; mucosa of sigmoid colon; popliteal artery; tibial arteries; biceps brachii; monocyte / Top expressed in: transitional epithelium of urinary bladder; left colon; conjunctival fornix; decidua; medial ganglionic eminence; blood; granulocyte; thymus; duodenum; jejunum; More reference expression data |
| BioGPS | n/a |
Gene ontology
| Molecular function | protein domain specific binding; protein binding; identical protein binding |
| Cellular component | cytoplasm; ESCRT III complex; cytosol; endosome; late endosome membrane; membrane; membrane coat; endosome membrane; extracellular exosome; nucleus; midbody; multivesicular body |
| Biological process | regulation of centrosome duplication; nucleus organization; establishment of protein localization; multivesicular body assembly; regulation of mitotic spindle assembly; cell division; protein transport; cell cycle; septum digestion after cytokinesis; mitotic metaphase plate congression; vacuolar transport; ESCRT III complex disassembly; transport; viral budding via host ESCRT complex; endosome transport via multivesicular body sorting pathway; late endosome to vacuole transport; midbody abscission |
Sources:Amigo / QuickGO
Orthologs
| Databases | NCBI: entry; OMA: entry |
| Species | Human | Mouse |
| Entrez | 57132 | 67064 |
| Ensembl | ENSG00000255112 | ENSMUSG00000109901 |
| UniProt | Q7LBR1 | Q99LU0 |
| RefSeq (mRNA) | NM_020412 | NM_024190 |
| RefSeq (protein) | NP_065145 | NP_077152 |
| Location (UCSC) | Chr 18: 11.85 – 11.85 Mb | Chr 18: 67.34 – 67.34 Mb |
| PubMed search |
- Wikidata
| View/Edit Human | View/Edit Mouse |

Charged multivesicular body protein 1b is a protein that in humans is encoded by the CHMP1B gene.
