= CHMP4A =

Protein-coding gene in humans

Identifiers
- Aliases: CHMP4A, C14orf123, CHMP4, CHMP4B, HSPC134, SHAX2, SNF7, SNF7-1, VPS32-1, VPS32A, charged multivesicular body protein 4A
- External IDs: OMIM: 610051; GeneCards: CHMP4A
Available structures
PDB	Human UniProt search: PDBe RCSB
PDB	List of PDB id codes 3C3O

Gene location (Human)
Chr.	Chromosome 14 (human)
Band	14q12	Start	24,209,615 bp
Band	14q12	End	24,213,830 bp
RNA expression pattern
Bgee	Human / Mouse (ortholog); Top expressed in: popliteal artery; tibial arteries; substantia nigra; granulocyte; monocyte; muscle layer of sigmoid colon; C1 segment; mucosa of transverse colon; left coronary artery; amygdala / n/a; More reference expression data
BioGPS	n/a
Gene ontology
Molecular function	protein homodimerization activity; ATPase binding; protein binding; identical protein binding; lipid binding
Cellular component	cytoplasm; ESCRT III complex; cytosol; endosome; membrane; late endosome membrane; plasma membrane; midbody; cytoplasmic side of plasma membrane; membrane coat; cytoplasmic vesicle membrane; cytoplasmic vesicle; nucleus
Biological process	negative regulation of autophagosome assembly; protein polymerization; viral life cycle; nucleus organization; membrane invagination; multivesicular body assembly; plasma membrane tubulation; endosomal transport; posttranslational protein targeting to endoplasmic reticulum membrane; vesicle budding from membrane; protein transport; septum digestion after cytokinesis; mitotic metaphase plate congression; protein homooligomerization; vacuolar transport; negative regulation of neuron death; macroautophagy; viral budding via host ESCRT complex; midbody abscission
Sources:Amigo / QuickGO
Orthologs
Databases	NCBI: entry; OMA: entry
Species	Human	Mouse
Entrez	29082	n/a
Ensembl	ENSG00000254505; ENSG00000285302	n/a
UniProt	Q9BY43	n/a
RefSeq (mRNA)	NM_014169	n/a
RefSeq (protein)	NP_054888	n/a
Location (UCSC)	Chr 14: 24.21 – 24.21 Mb	n/a
PubMed search		n/a
- Wikidata
View/Edit Human

Charged multivesicular body protein 4a is a protein that in humans is encoded by the CHMP4A gene.
