= CHMP4B =

Protein-coding gene in humans

Identifiers
- Aliases: CHMP4B, C20orf178, CHMP4A, CTPP3, CTRCT31, SNF7, SNF7-2, Shax1, VPS32B, Vps32-2, dJ553F4.4, charged multivesicular body protein 4B
- External IDs: OMIM: 610897; MGI: 1922858; GeneCards: CHMP4B
Available structures
PDB	Ortholog search: PDBe RCSB
PDB	List of PDB id codes 3C3Q, 3UM3, 4ABM

Gene location (Human)
Chr.	Chromosome 20 (human)
Band	20q11.22	Start	33,811,348 bp
Band	20q11.22	End	33,854,366 bp

Gene location (Mouse)
Chr.	Chromosome 2 (mouse)
Band	2|2 H1	Start	154,493,625 bp
Band	2|2 H1	End	154,536,705 bp
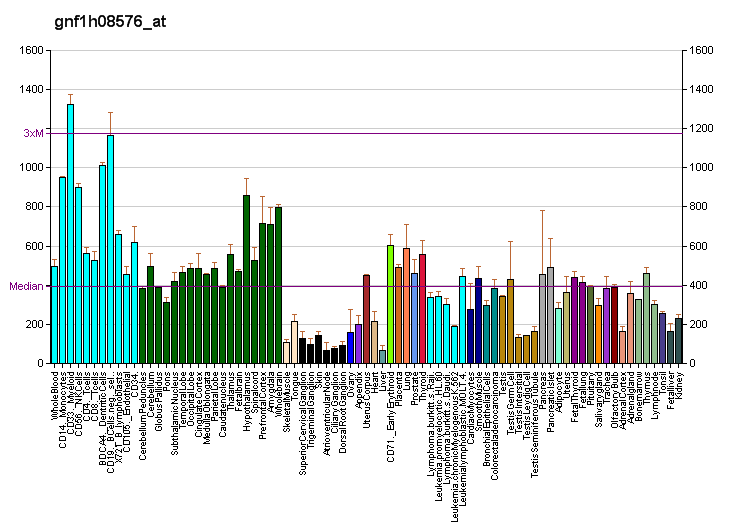
RNA expression pattern
Bgee	Human / Mouse (ortholog); Top expressed in: mucosa of ileum; skin of arm; tibialis anterior muscle; nasal epithelium; mucosa of transverse colon; cartilage tissue; cardiac muscle tissue of right atrium; muscle layer of sigmoid colon; gastric mucosa; tibial arteries / Top expressed in: vestibular membrane of cochlear duct; Ileal epithelium; Epithelium of choroid plexus; transitional epithelium of urinary bladder; conjunctival fornix; substantia nigra; facial motor nucleus; anterior horn of spinal cord; iris; motor neuron; More reference expression data
BioGPS	More reference expression data
Gene ontology
Molecular function	protein homodimerization activity; protein binding; identical protein binding; cadherin binding
Cellular component	cytoplasm; ESCRT III complex; cytosol; endosome; membrane; late endosome membrane; cytoplasmic side of plasma membrane; membrane coat; extracellular exosome; vesicle; midbody; nuclear envelope; nucleus
Biological process	negative regulation of autophagosome assembly; regulation of centrosome duplication; viral life cycle; nucleus organization; maintenance of lens transparency; multivesicular body assembly; negative regulation of cell death; regulation of mitotic spindle assembly; autophagy; endosomal transport; posttranslational protein targeting to endoplasmic reticulum membrane; ubiquitin-independent protein catabolic process via the multivesicular body sorting pathway; protein transport; septum digestion after cytokinesis; mitotic metaphase plate congression; protein homooligomerization; vacuolar transport; negative regulation of neuron death; nuclear membrane reassembly; exit from mitosis; mitotic cytokinesis; regulation of autophagy; membrane fission; macroautophagy; transport; viral budding via host ESCRT complex; midbody abscission
Sources:Amigo / QuickGO
Orthologs
Databases	NCBI: entry; OMA: entry
Species	Human	Mouse
Entrez	128866	75608
Ensembl	ENSG00000101421	ENSMUSG00000038467
UniProt	Q9H444	Q9D8B3
RefSeq (mRNA)	NM_176812	NM_029362
RefSeq (protein)	NP_789782	NP_083638
Location (UCSC)	Chr 20: 33.81 – 33.85 Mb	Chr 2: 154.49 – 154.54 Mb
PubMed search
- Wikidata
View/Edit Human	View/Edit Mouse

Charged multivesicular body protein 4b is a protein that in humans is encoded by the CHMP4B gene.
