= NVL (gene) =

Protein-coding gene in humans

Identifiers
- Aliases: NVL, NVL2, nuclear VCP-like, nuclear VCP like
- External IDs: OMIM: 602426; MGI: 1914709; GeneCards: NVL
Available structures
PDB	Ortholog search: PDBe RCSB
PDB	List of PDB id codes 2X8A

Gene location (Human)
Chr.	Chromosome 1 (human)
Band	1q42.11	Start	224,227,334 bp
Band	1q42.11	End	224,330,189 bp

Gene location (Mouse)
Chr.	Chromosome 1 (mouse)
Band	1|1 H4	Start	180,914,703 bp
Band	1|1 H4	End	180,971,769 bp
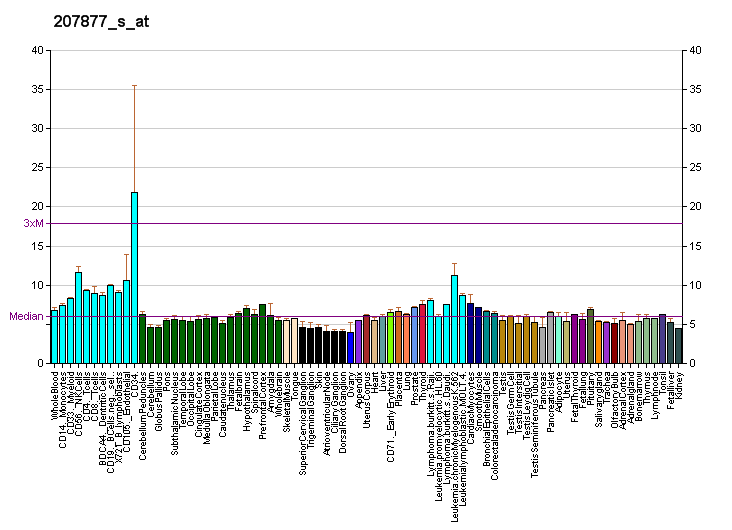
RNA expression pattern
Bgee	Human / Mouse (ortholog); Top expressed in: sural nerve; Achilles tendon; mucosa of transverse colon; ventricular zone; ganglionic eminence; gonad; cerebellar hemisphere; right hemisphere of cerebellum; testicle; skin of abdomen / Top expressed in: tail of embryo; genital tubercle; cumulus cell; ventricular zone; superior frontal gyrus; epiblast; spermatocyte; morula; ankle joint; Ileal epithelium; More reference expression data
BioGPS	More reference expression data
Gene ontology
Molecular function	nucleotide binding; preribosome binding; protein binding; ATP binding; RNA binding; ATPase activity
Cellular component	nucleolus; membrane; nucleus; telomerase holoenzyme complex; nucleoplasm; nuclear exosome (RNase complex)
Biological process	ribosome biogenesis; positive regulation of telomerase activity; rRNA processing; positive regulation of protein binding; ribosomal large subunit biogenesis; regulation of protein localization to nucleolus
Sources:Amigo / QuickGO
Orthologs
Databases	NCBI: entry; OMA: entry
Species	Human	Mouse
Entrez	4931	67459
Ensembl	ENSG00000143748	ENSMUSG00000026516
UniProt	O15381	Q9DBY8
RefSeq (mRNA)	NM_001243146; NM_001243147; NM_002533; NM_206840	NM_026171
RefSeq (protein)	NP_001230075; NP_001230076; NP_002524; NP_996671	NP_080447
Location (UCSC)	Chr 1: 224.23 – 224.33 Mb	Chr 1: 180.91 – 180.97 Mb
PubMed search
- Wikidata
View/Edit Human	View/Edit Mouse

Nuclear valosin-containing protein-like is a protein that in humans is encoded by the NVL gene.
