= CHMP4C =

Protein-coding gene in humans

Identifiers
- Aliases: CHMP4C, SNF7-3, Shax3, VPS32C, charged multivesicular body protein 4C
- External IDs: OMIM: 610899; MGI: 1913621; GeneCards: CHMP4C
Available structures
| PDB | Ortholog search: PDBe RCSB |
| PDB | List of PDB id codes 3C3R |

Gene location (Human)
| Chr. | Chromosome 8 (human) |
| Band | 8q21.13 | Start | 81,732,448 bp |
| Band | 8q21.13 | End | 81,759,515 bp |

Gene location (Mouse)
| Chr. | Chromosome 3 (mouse) |
| Band | 3|3 A1 | Start | 10,431,967 bp |
| Band | 3|3 A1 | End | 10,493,916 bp |
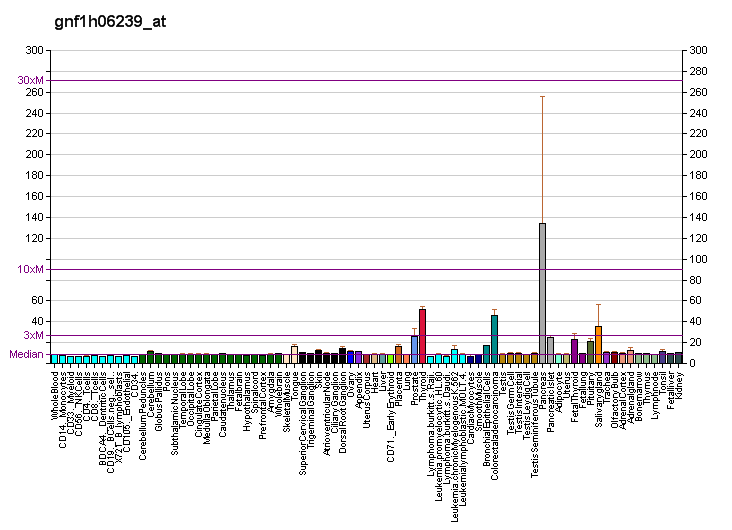
RNA expression pattern
| Bgee | Human / Mouse (ortholog); Top expressed in: amniotic fluid; jejunal mucosa; mucosa of ileum; skin of arm; palpebral conjunctiva; parotid gland; duodenum; pancreatic epithelial cell; gingival epithelium; mucosa of colon / Top expressed in: interventricular septum; ileum; duodenum; jejunum; epithelium of stomach; Paneth cell; left colon; ascending aorta; parotid gland; epithelium of small intestine; More reference expression data |
| BioGPS | More reference expression data |
Gene ontology
| Molecular function | protein homodimerization activity; protein binding |
| Cellular component | cytoplasm; ESCRT III complex; cytosol; endosome; membrane; late endosome membrane; midbody; Flemming body |
| Biological process | regulation of centrosome duplication; abscission; viral budding via host ESCRT complex; viral life cycle; nucleus organization; multivesicular body assembly; regulation of mitotic spindle assembly; endosomal transport; ubiquitin-independent protein catabolic process via the multivesicular body sorting pathway; protein transport; negative regulation of cytokinesis; septum digestion after cytokinesis; mitotic metaphase plate congression; vacuolar transport; macroautophagy; mitotic cytokinesis checkpoint signaling; midbody abscission |
Sources:Amigo / QuickGO
Orthologs
| Databases | NCBI: entry; OMA: entry |
| Species | Human | Mouse |
| Entrez | 92421 | 66371 |
| Ensembl | ENSG00000164695 | ENSMUSG00000027536 |
| UniProt | Q96CF2 | Q9D7F7 |
| RefSeq (mRNA) | NM_152284 | NM_025519 |
| RefSeq (protein) | NP_689497 | NP_079795 |
| Location (UCSC) | Chr 8: 81.73 – 81.76 Mb | Chr 3: 10.43 – 10.49 Mb |
| PubMed search |
- Wikidata
| View/Edit Human | View/Edit Mouse |

Charged multivesicular body protein 4c is a protein that in humans is encoded by the CHMP4C gene.
