= CHMP1A =

Protein-coding gene in humans

Identifiers
- Aliases: CHMP1A, CHMP1, PCH8, PCOLN3, PRSM1, VPS46-1, VPS46A, charged multivesicular body protein 1A
- External IDs: OMIM: 164010; MGI: 1920159; GeneCards: CHMP1A
Available structures
| PDB | Ortholog search: PDBe RCSB |
| PDB | List of PDB id codes 2JQ9, 2YMB, 4A5X |

Gene location (Human)
| Chr. | Chromosome 16 (human) |
| Band | 16q24.3 | Start | 89,640,816 bp |
| Band | 16q24.3 | End | 89,657,738 bp |

Gene location (Mouse)
| Chr. | Chromosome 8 (mouse) |
| Band | 8|8 E1 | Start | 123,931,003 bp |
| Band | 8|8 E1 | End | 123,939,502 bp |
RNA expression pattern
| Bgee | Human / Mouse (ortholog); Top expressed in: mucosa of transverse colon; left testis; right testis; granulocyte; right uterine tube; skin of leg; skin of abdomen; body of stomach; right frontal lobe; cingulate gyrus / Top expressed in: lip; granulocyte; esophagus; transitional epithelium of urinary bladder; right kidney; interventricular septum; stroma of bone marrow; duodenum; dentate gyrus of hippocampal formation granule cell; intestinal villus; More reference expression data |
| BioGPS | n/a |
Gene ontology
| Molecular function | protein homodimerization activity; protein domain specific binding; zinc ion binding; protein binding; identical protein binding; metallopeptidase activity |
| Cellular component | cytoplasm; endosome; membrane; microtubule organizing center; condensed nuclear chromosome; early endosome; endosome membrane; extracellular exosome; endomembrane system; nucleus; nuclear matrix; ESCRT III complex; multivesicular body |
| Biological process | carbon catabolite repression of transcription by glucose; regulation of centrosome duplication; regulation of transcription, DNA-templated; viral budding via host ESCRT complex; nucleus organization; multivesicular body assembly; regulation of mitotic spindle assembly; transcription, DNA-templated; cell division; protein transport; cell cycle; septum digestion after cytokinesis; mitotic metaphase plate congression; negative regulation of transcription, DNA-templated; vacuolar transport; ESCRT III complex disassembly; proteolysis; mitotic chromosome condensation; vesicle-mediated transport; transport; endosome transport via multivesicular body sorting pathway; late endosome to vacuole transport; negative regulation of cell cycle; midbody abscission |
Sources:Amigo / QuickGO
Orthologs
| Databases | NCBI: entry; OMA: entry |
| Species | Human | Mouse |
| Entrez | 5119 | 234852 |
| Ensembl | ENSG00000131165 | ENSMUSG00000000743 |
| UniProt | Q9HD42 | Q921W0 |
| RefSeq (mRNA) | NM_001083314; NM_002768 | NM_145606 |
| RefSeq (protein) | NP_001076783; NP_002759 | NP_663581 |
| Location (UCSC) | Chr 16: 89.64 – 89.66 Mb | Chr 8: 123.93 – 123.94 Mb |
| PubMed search |
- Wikidata
| View/Edit Human | View/Edit Mouse |

Charged multivesicular body protein 1a is a protein that in humans is encoded by the CHMP1A gene.

== Function ==
This gene encodes a member of the CHMP/Chmp family of proteins which are involved in multivesicular body sorting of proteins to the interiors of lysosomes. The initial prediction of the protein sequence encoded by this gene suggested that the encoded protein was a metallopeptidase. The nomenclature has been updated recently to reflect the correct biological function of this encoded protein.

== Interactions ==
CHMP1A has been shown to interact with VPS4A.
