= PSMC2 =

Enzyme found in humans

Identifiers
- Aliases: PSMC2, MSS1, Nbla10058, S7, proteasome 26S subunit, ATPase 2, RPT1
- External IDs: OMIM: 154365; MGI: 109555; GeneCards: PSMC2

Gene location (Human)
Chr.	Chromosome 7 (human)
Band	7q22.1	Start	103,328,570 bp
Band	7q22.1	End	103,370,346 bp

Gene location (Mouse)
Chr.	Chromosome 5 (mouse)
Band	5 A3|5 9.97 cM	Start	21,990,281 bp
Band	5 A3|5 9.97 cM	End	22,008,785 bp
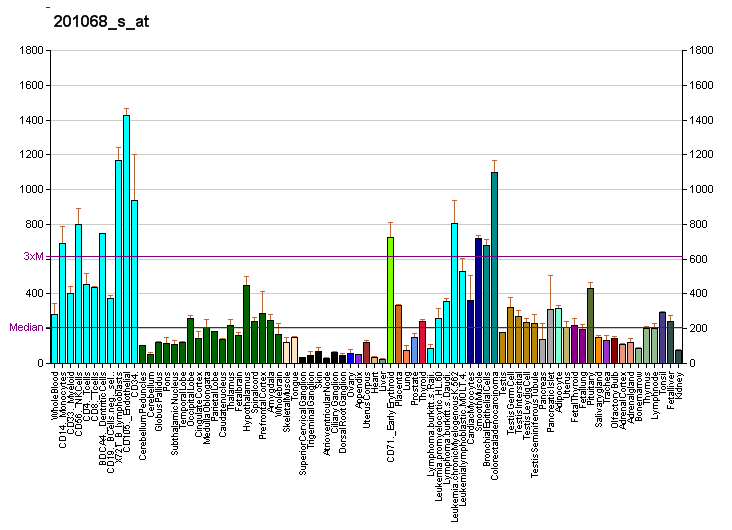

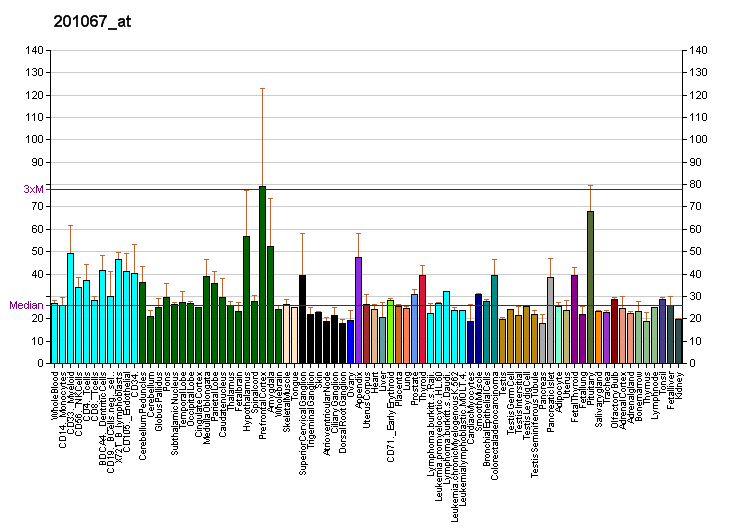
RNA expression pattern
Bgee	Human / Mouse (ortholog); Top expressed in: Skeletal muscle tissue of biceps brachii; epithelium of nasopharynx; sperm; gingival epithelium; visceral pleura; palpebral conjunctiva; skin of hip; Skeletal muscle tissue of rectus abdominis; parietal pleura; tibia / Top expressed in: facial motor nucleus; primitive streak; motor neuron; superior cervical ganglion; medullary collecting duct; seminiferous tubule; Epithelium of choroid plexus; ureter; fossa; hair follicle; More reference expression data
BioGPS	More reference expression data
Gene ontology
Molecular function	nucleotide binding; ATPase activity; protein binding; TBP-class protein binding; ATP binding; hydrolase activity; proteasome-activating activity
Cellular component	nuclear proteasome complex; proteasome regulatory particle, base subcomplex; membrane; proteasome accessory complex; nucleoplasm; cytosolic proteasome complex; proteasome complex; nucleus; extracellular region; cytoplasm; cytosol; secretory granule lumen; ficolin-1-rich granule lumen; P-body; cytoplasmic ribonucleoprotein granule; dendritic spine
Biological process	positive regulation of RNA polymerase II transcription preinitiation complex assembly; regulation of cellular amino acid metabolic process; antigen processing and presentation of exogenous peptide antigen via MHC class I, TAP-dependent; ubiquitin-dependent protein catabolic process; regulation of mRNA stability; positive regulation of canonical Wnt signaling pathway; protein polyubiquitination; stimulatory C-type lectin receptor signaling pathway; tumor necrosis factor-mediated signaling pathway; MAPK cascade; Fc-epsilon receptor signaling pathway; protein catabolic process; NIK/NF-kappaB signaling; osteoblast differentiation; ubiquitin-dependent ERAD pathway; anaphase-promoting complex-dependent catabolic process; T cell receptor signaling pathway; negative regulation of canonical Wnt signaling pathway; proteasome-mediated ubiquitin-dependent protein catabolic process; Wnt signaling pathway, planar cell polarity pathway; viral process; positive regulation of proteasomal protein catabolic process; negative regulation of G2/M transition of mitotic cell cycle; protein deubiquitination; SCF-dependent proteasomal ubiquitin-dependent protein catabolic process; neutrophil degranulation; transmembrane transport; regulation of transcription from RNA polymerase II promoter in response to hypoxia; post-translational protein modification; regulation of hematopoietic stem cell differentiation; interleukin-1-mediated signaling pathway; regulation of mitotic cell cycle phase transition
Sources:Amigo / QuickGO
Orthologs
Databases	NCBI: entry; OMA: entry
Species	Human	Mouse
Entrez	5701	19181
Ensembl	ENSG00000161057	ENSMUSG00000028932
UniProt	P35998	P46471; Q8BVQ9
RefSeq (mRNA)	NM_001204453; NM_002803	NM_011188; NM_001368661
RefSeq (protein)	NP_001191382; NP_002794	NP_035318; NP_001355590
Location (UCSC)	Chr 7: 103.33 – 103.37 Mb	Chr 5: 21.99 – 22.01 Mb
PubMed search
- Wikidata
View/Edit Human	View/Edit Mouse

26S protease regulatory subunit 7, also known as 26S proteasome AAA-ATPase subunit Rpt1, is an enzyme that in humans is encoded by the PSMC2 gene This protein is one of the 19 essential subunits of a complete assembled 19S proteasome complex. Six 26S proteasome AAA-ATPase subunits (Rpt1 (this protein), Rpt2, Rpt3, Rpt4, Rpt5, and Rpt6) together with four non-ATPase subunits (Rpn1, Rpn2, Rpn10, and Rpn13) form the base sub complex of 19S regulatory particle for proteasome complex.

== Gene ==
The gene PSMC2 encodes one of the ATPase subunits, a member of the triple-A family of ATPases which have a chaperone-like activity. This subunit has been shown to interact with several of the basal transcription factors so, in addition to participation in proteasome functions, this subunit may participate in the regulation of transcription. This subunit may also compete with PSMC3 for binding to the HIV tat protein to regulate the interaction between the viral protein and the transcription complex. The human PSMC2 gene has 13 exons and locates at chromosome band 7q22.1-q22.3.

== Protein ==
The human protein 26S protease regulatory subunit 7 is 48.6kDa in size and composed of 433 amino acids. The calculated theoretical pI of this protein is 526S protease regulatory subunit 5.71. One expression isoform is generated by alternative splicing, in which 1–137 of the amino acid sequence is missing.

== Complex assembly ==
26S proteasome complex is usually consisted of a 20S core particle (CP, or 20S proteasome) and one or two 19S regulatory particles (RP, or 19S proteasome) on either one side or both side of the barrel-shaped 20S. The CP and RPs pertain distinct structural characteristics and biological functions. In brief, 20S sub complex presents three types proteolytic activities, including caspase-like, trypsin-like, and chymotrypsin-like activities. These proteolytic active sites located in the inner side of a chamber formed by 4 stacked rings of 20S subunits, preventing random protein-enzyme encounter and uncontrolled protein degradation. The 19S regulatory particles can recognize ubiquitin-labeled protein as degradation substrate, unfold the protein to linear, open the gate of 20S core particle, and guide the substrate into the proteolytic chamber. To meet such functional complexity, 19S regulatory particle contains at least 18 constitutive subunits. These subunits can be categorized into two classes based on the ATP dependence of subunits, ATP-dependent subunits and ATP-independent subunits. According to the protein interaction and topological characteristics of this multisubunit complex, the 19S regulatory particle is composed of a base and a lid subcomplex. The base consists of a ring of six AAA ATPases (Subunit Rpt1–6, systematic nomenclature) and four non-ATPase subunits (Rpn1, Rpn2, Rpn10, and Rpn13). Thus, 26S protease regulatory subunit 4 (Rpt2) is an essential component of forming the base subcomplex of 19S regulatory particle. For the assembly of 19S base sub complex, four sets of pivotal assembly chaperons (Hsm3/S5b, Nas2/P27, Nas6/P28, and Rpn14/PAAF1, nomenclature in yeast/mammals) were identified by four groups independently. These 19S regulatory particle base-dedicated chaperons all binds to individual ATPase subunits through the C-terminal regions. For example, Hsm3/S5b binds to the subunit Rpt1 (this protein) and Rpt2, Nas2/p27 to Rpt5, Nas6/p28 to Rpt3, and Rpn14/PAAAF1 to Rpt6, respectively. Subsequently, three intermediate assembly modules are formed as following, the Nas6/p28-Rpt3-Rpt6-Rpn14/PAAF1 module, the Nas2/p27-Rpt4-Rpt5 module, and the Hsm3/S5b-Rpt1-Rpt2-Rpn2 module. Eventually, these three modules assemble together to form the heterohexameric ring of 6 Atlases with Rpn1. The final addition of Rpn13 indicates the completion of 19S base sub complex assembly.

== Function ==
As the degradation machinery that is responsible for ~70% of intracellular proteolysis, proteasome complex (26S proteasome) plays a critical roles in maintaining the homeostasis of cellular proteome. Accordingly, misfolded proteins and damaged protein need to be continuously removed to recycle amino acids for new synthesis; in parallel, some key regulatory proteins fulfill their biological functions via selective degradation; furthermore, proteins are digested into peptides for MHC class I antigen presentation. To meet such complicated demands in biological process via spatial and temporal proteolysis, protein substrates have to be recognized, recruited, and eventually hydrolyzed in a well controlled fashion. Thus, 19S regulatory particle pertains a series of important capabilities to address these functional challenges. To recognize protein as designated substrate, 19S complex has subunits that are capable to recognize proteins with a special degradative tag, the ubiquitinylation. It also have subunits that can bind with nucleotides (e.g., ATPs) in order to facilitate the association between 19S and 20S particles, as well as to cause confirmation changes of alpha subunit C-terminals that form the substrate entrance of 20S complex. The ATPases subunits assemble into a six-membered ring with a sequence of Rpt1–Rpt5–Rpt4–Rpt3–Rpt6–Rpt2, which interacts with the seven-membered alpha ring of 20S core particle and establishes an asymmetric interface between the 19S RP and the 20S CP. Three C-terminal tails with HbYX motifs of distinct Rpt ATPases insert into pockets between two defined alpha subunits of the CP and regulate the gate opening of the central channels in the CP alpha ring.

== Interactions ==
PSMC2 has been shown to interact with:

- NDC80,
- PSMC1,
- PSMC4, and
- PSMD5.
