= PSMC5 =

Enzyme found in humans

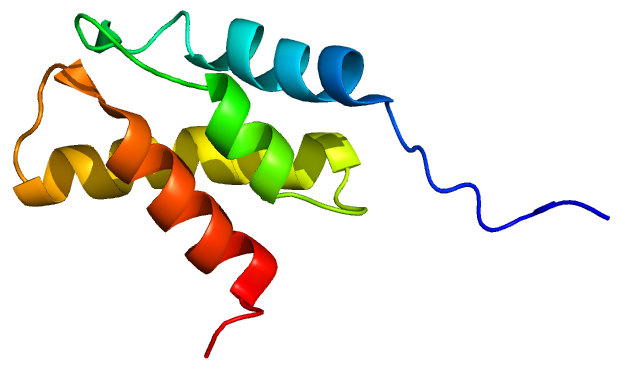

Identifiers
- Aliases: PSMC5, S8, SUG-1, SUG1, TBP10, TRIP1, p45, p45/SUG, proteasome 26S subunit, ATPase 5, RPT6
- External IDs: OMIM: 601681; MGI: 105047; GeneCards: PSMC5
Available structures
PDB	Ortholog search: PDBe RCSB
PDB	List of PDB id codes 2KRK, 3KW6

Gene location (Human)
Chr.	Chromosome 17 (human)
Band	17q23.3	Start	63,827,152 bp
Band	17q23.3	End	63,832,026 bp

Gene location (Mouse)
Chr.	Chromosome 11 (mouse)
Band	11|11 E1	Start	106,146,980 bp
Band	11|11 E1	End	106,153,946 bp
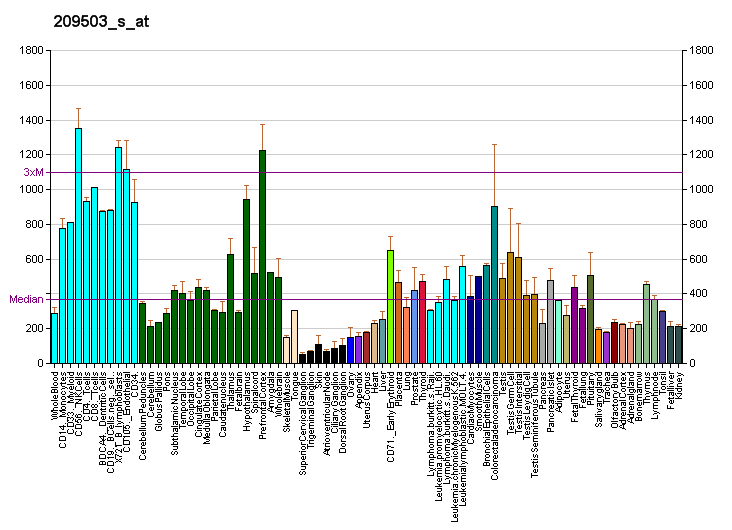
RNA expression pattern
Bgee	Human / Mouse (ortholog); Top expressed in: tendon of biceps brachii; cerebellar cortex; cerebellar hemisphere; right hemisphere of cerebellum; right testis; gastrocnemius muscle; left testis; anterior pituitary; gastric mucosa; islet of Langerhans / Top expressed in: otic placode; saccule; medial vestibular nucleus; deep cerebellar nuclei; dorsal tegmental nucleus; pontine nuclei; tail of embryo; somite; otic vesicle; habenula; More reference expression data
BioGPS	More reference expression data
Gene ontology
Molecular function	nucleotide binding; thyrotropin-releasing hormone receptor binding; protein binding; ATP binding; signaling receptor binding; hydrolase activity; ATPase activity; TBP-class protein binding; transcription factor binding; proteasome-activating activity
Cellular component	cytosol; proteasome regulatory particle, base subcomplex; blood microparticle; membrane; proteasome regulatory particle; nucleoplasm; inclusion body; extracellular exosome; cytoplasmic vesicle; proteasome complex; cytosolic proteasome complex; cytoplasm; proteasome accessory complex; nucleus; nuclear proteasome complex; postsynapse
Biological process	positive regulation of RNA polymerase II transcription preinitiation complex assembly; regulation of cellular amino acid metabolic process; antigen processing and presentation of exogenous peptide antigen via MHC class I, TAP-dependent; regulation of mRNA stability; positive regulation of canonical Wnt signaling pathway; protein polyubiquitination; stimulatory C-type lectin receptor signaling pathway; tumor necrosis factor-mediated signaling pathway; positive regulation of inclusion body assembly; MAPK cascade; positive regulation of transcription, DNA-templated; Fc-epsilon receptor signaling pathway; protein catabolic process; NIK/NF-kappaB signaling; ubiquitin-dependent ERAD pathway; negative regulation of programmed cell death; anaphase-promoting complex-dependent catabolic process; negative regulation of transcription, DNA-templated; T cell receptor signaling pathway; negative regulation of canonical Wnt signaling pathway; proteasome-mediated ubiquitin-dependent protein catabolic process; Wnt signaling pathway, planar cell polarity pathway; positive regulation of proteasomal protein catabolic process; negative regulation of G2/M transition of mitotic cell cycle; protein deubiquitination; SCF-dependent proteasomal ubiquitin-dependent protein catabolic process; transmembrane transport; regulation of transcription from RNA polymerase II promoter in response to hypoxia; modulation of chemical synaptic transmission; regulation of transcription by RNA polymerase II; post-translational protein modification; regulation of hematopoietic stem cell differentiation; interleukin-1-mediated signaling pathway; regulation of mitotic cell cycle phase transition
Sources:Amigo / QuickGO
Orthologs
Databases	NCBI: entry; OMA: entry
Species	Human	Mouse
Entrez	5705	19184
Ensembl	ENSG00000087191	ENSMUSG00000020708
UniProt	P62195	P62196
RefSeq (mRNA)	NM_001199163; NM_002805	NM_008950
RefSeq (protein)	NP_001186092; NP_002796	NP_032976
Location (UCSC)	Chr 17: 63.83 – 63.83 Mb	Chr 11: 106.15 – 106.15 Mb
PubMed search
- Wikidata
View/Edit Human	View/Edit Mouse

26S protease regulatory subunit 8, also known as 26S proteasome AAA-ATPase subunit Rpt6, is an enzyme that in humans is encoded by the PSMC5 gene. This protein is one of the 19 essential subunits of a complete assembled 19S proteasome complex Six 26S proteasome AAA-ATPase subunits (Rpt1, Rpt2, Rpt3, Rpt4, Rpt5, and Rpt6 (this protein)) together with four non-ATPase subunits (Rpn1, Rpn2, Rpn10, and Rpn13) form the base sub complex of 19S regulatory particle for proteasome complex.

== Gene ==
The gene PSMC5 encodes one of the ATPase subunits, a member of the triple-A family of ATPases which have a chaperone-like activity. In addition to participation in proteasome functions, this subunit may participate in transcriptional regulation since it has been shown to interact with the thyroid hormone receptor and retinoid X receptor-alpha. The human PSMC5 gene has 13 exons and locates at chromosome band 17q23.3.

== Protein ==
The human protein 26S protease regulatory subunit 8 is 45.6kDa in size and composed of 406 amino acids. The calculated theoretical pI of this protein is 8.23.

== Complex assembly ==
26S proteasome complex is usually consisted of a 20S core particle (CP, or 20S proteasome) and one or two 19S regulatory particles (RP, or 19S proteasome) on either one side or both side of the barrel-shaped 20S. The CP and RPs pertain distinct structural characteristics and biological functions. In brief, 20S sub complex presents three types proteolytic activities, including caspase-like, trypsin-like, and chymotrypsin-like activities. These proteolytic active sites located in the inner side of a chamber formed by 4 stacked rings of 20S subunits, preventing random protein-enzyme encounter and uncontrolled protein degradation. The 19S regulatory particles can recognize ubiquitin-labeled protein as degradation substrate, unfold the protein to linear, open the gate of 20S core particle, and guide the substrate into the proteolytic chamber. To meet such functional complexity, 19S regulatory particle contains at least 18 constitutive subunits. These subunits can be categorized into two classes based on the ATP dependence of subunits, ATP-dependent subunits and ATP-independent subunits. According to the protein interaction and topological characteristics of this multisubunit complex, the 19S regulatory particle is composed of a base and a lid subcomplex. The base consists of a ring of six AAA ATPases (Subunit Rpt1-6, systematic nomenclature) and four non-ATPase subunits (Rpn1, Rpn2, Rpn10, and Rpn13). Thus, 26S protease regulatory subunit 4 (Rpt2) is an essential component of forming the base subcomplex of 19S regulatory particle. For the assembly of 19S base sub complex, four sets of pivotal assembly chaperons (Hsm3/S5b, Nas2/P27, Nas6/P28, and Rpn14/PAAF1, nomenclature in yeast/mammals) were identified by four groups independently. These 19S regulatory particle base-dedicated chaperons all binds to individual ATPase subunits through the C-terminal regions. For example, Hsm3/S5b binds to the subunit Rpt1 and Rpt2 (this protein), Nas2/p27 to Rpt5, Nas6/p28 to Rpt3, and Rpn14/PAAAF1 to Rpt6 (this protein), respectively. Subsequently, three intermediate assembly modules are formed as following, the Nas6/p28-Rpt3-Rpt6-Rpn14/PAAF1 module, the Nas2/p27-Rpt4-Rpt5 module, and the Hsm3/S5b-Rpt1-Rpt2-Rpn2 module. Eventually, these three modules assemble together to form the heterohexameric ring of 6 Atlases with Rpn1. The final addition of Rpn13 indicates the completion of 19S base sub complex assembly.

== Function ==
As the degradation machinery that is responsible for ~70% of intracellular proteolysis, proteasome complex (26S proteasome) plays a critical roles in maintaining the homeostasis of cellular proteome. Accordingly, misfolded proteins and damaged protein need to be continuously removed to recycle amino acids for new synthesis; in parallel, some key regulatory proteins fulfill their biological functions via selective degradation; furthermore, proteins are digested into peptides for MHC class I antigen presentation. To meet such complicated demands in biological process via spatial and temporal proteolysis, protein substrates have to be recognized, recruited, and eventually hydrolyzed in a well controlled fashion. Thus, 19S regulatory particle pertains a series of important capabilities to address these functional challenges. To recognize protein as designated substrate, 19S complex has subunits that are capable to recognize proteins with a special degradative tag, the ubiquitinylation. It also have subunits that can bind with nucleotides (e.g., ATPs) in order to facilitate the association between 19S and 20S particles, as well as to cause confirmation changes of alpha subunit C-terminals that form the substrate entrance of 20S complex.

The ATPases subunits assemble into a six-membered ring with a sequence of Rpt1–Rpt5–Rpt4–Rpt3–Rpt6–Rpt2, which interacts with the seven-membered alpha ring of 20S core particle and establishes an asymmetric interface between the 19S RP and the 20S CP. Three C-terminal tails with HbYX motifs of distinct Rpt ATPases insert into pockets between two defined alpha subunits of the CP and regulate the gate opening of the central channels in the CP alpha ring. Evidence showed that ATPase subunit Rpt5, along with other ubuiqintinated 19S proteasome subunits (Rpn13, Rpn10) and the deubiquitinating enzyme Uch37, can be ubiquitinated in situ by proteasome-associating ubiquitination enzymes. Ubiquitination of proteasome subunits can regulates proteasomal activity in response to the alteration of cellular ubiquitination levels.

== Interactions ==
PSMC5 has been shown to interact with:

- PSMC3,
- PSMC4,
- Sp1 transcription factor, and
- XPB.

== Children with PSMC5 Mutations ==
As of 2021, only 18 reports of children with PSMC5 mutations have been discovered. <GeneMatcher> There is one foundation that is performing research with children who has PSMC5 mutations called PSMC5 Foundation, www.psmc5.org. The aim is to find therapies and learn more about how to resolve issues with mutations. The common effects have been developmental delays, ranging from motor delays to minimal expressive language.
