= PSMC1 =

Enzyme found in humans

Identifiers
- Aliases: PSMC1, P26S4, S4, p56, proteasome 26S subunit, ATPase 1, RPT2
- External IDs: OMIM: 602706; MGI: 106054; GeneCards: PSMC1

Gene location (Human)
Chr.	Chromosome 14 (human)
Band	14q32.11	Start	90,256,527 bp
Band	14q32.11	End	90,275,429 bp

Gene location (Mouse)
Chr.	Chromosome 12 (mouse)
Band	12 E|12 50.43 cM	Start	100,076,413 bp
Band	12 E|12 50.43 cM	End	100,089,664 bp
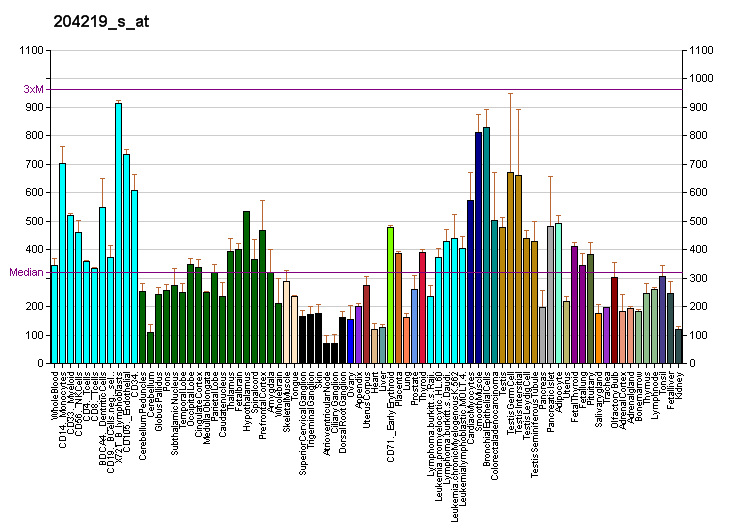
RNA expression pattern
Bgee	Human / Mouse (ortholog); Top expressed in: Achilles tendon; gastrocnemius muscle; islet of Langerhans; muscle of thigh; skeletal muscle tissue; placenta; smooth muscle tissue; left testis; endometrium; right testis / Top expressed in: yolk sac; neural layer of retina; dentate gyrus of hippocampal formation granule cell; epiblast; lens; ventricular zone; cerebellum; olfactory bulb; neural tube; skeletal muscle tissue; More reference expression data
BioGPS	More reference expression data
Gene ontology
Molecular function	nucleotide binding; ATPase activity; protein binding; ATP binding; hydrolase activity; TBP-class protein binding; RNA binding; proteasome-activating activity
Cellular component	nuclear proteasome complex; proteasome regulatory particle, base subcomplex; proteasome regulatory particle; cytosolic proteasome complex; proteasome accessory complex; membrane; nucleoplasm; nucleus; proteasome complex; cytoplasm; cytosol
Biological process	positive regulation of RNA polymerase II transcription preinitiation complex assembly; regulation of cellular amino acid metabolic process; antigen processing and presentation of exogenous peptide antigen via MHC class I, TAP-dependent; regulation of mRNA stability; positive regulation of canonical Wnt signaling pathway; protein polyubiquitination; stimulatory C-type lectin receptor signaling pathway; tumor necrosis factor-mediated signaling pathway; MAPK cascade; Fc-epsilon receptor signaling pathway; protein catabolic process; NIK/NF-kappaB signaling; ubiquitin-dependent ERAD pathway; anaphase-promoting complex-dependent catabolic process; T cell receptor signaling pathway; negative regulation of canonical Wnt signaling pathway; negative regulation of neuron death; Wnt signaling pathway, planar cell polarity pathway; positive regulation of proteasomal protein catabolic process; proteasome-mediated ubiquitin-dependent protein catabolic process; protein folding; negative regulation of G2/M transition of mitotic cell cycle; protein deubiquitination; SCF-dependent proteasomal ubiquitin-dependent protein catabolic process; transmembrane transport; regulation of transcription from RNA polymerase II promoter in response to hypoxia; post-translational protein modification; regulation of hematopoietic stem cell differentiation; interleukin-1-mediated signaling pathway; regulation of mitotic cell cycle phase transition
Sources:Amigo / QuickGO
Orthologs
Databases	NCBI: entry; OMA: entry
Species	Human	Mouse
Entrez	5700	19179
Ensembl	ENSG00000100764	ENSMUSG00000021178
UniProt	P62191	P62192
RefSeq (mRNA)	NM_002802; NM_001330212	NM_008947
RefSeq (protein)	NP_001317141; NP_002793	NP_032973
Location (UCSC)	Chr 14: 90.26 – 90.28 Mb	Chr 12: 100.08 – 100.09 Mb
PubMed search
- Wikidata
View/Edit Human	View/Edit Mouse

26S protease regulatory subunit 4, also known as 26S proteasome AAA-ATPase subunit Rpt2, is an enzyme that in humans is encoded by the PSMC1 gene. This protein is one of the 19 essential subunits of a complete assembled 19S proteasome complex. Six 26S proteasome AAA-ATPase subunits (Rpt1, Rpt2 (this protein), Rpt3, Rpt4, Rpt5, and Rpt6) together with four non-ATPase subunits (Rpn1, Rpn2, Rpn10, and Rpn13) form the base sub complex of 19S regulatory particle for proteasome complex.

== Gene ==
The gene PSMC1 encodes one of the ATPase subunits, a member of the triple-A family of ATPases which have a chaperone-like activity. The human PSMC1 gene has 11 exons and locates at chromosome band 14q32.11.

== Protein ==
The human protein 26S protease regulatory subunit 4 is 49kDa in size and composed of 440 amino acids. The calculated theoretical pI of this protein is 526S protease regulatory subunit 5.68. One expression isoform is generated by alternative splicing, in which 1-73 of the amino acid sequence is missing.

== Complex assembly ==
26S proteasome complex is usually consisted of a 20S core particle (CP, or 20S proteasome) and one or two 19S regulatory particles (RP, or 19S proteasome) on either one side or both side of the barrel-shaped 20S. The CP and RPs pertain distinct structural characteristics and biological functions. In brief, 20S sub complex presents three types proteolytic activities, including caspase-like, trypsin-like, and chymotrypsin-like activities. These proteolytic active sites located in the inner side of a chamber formed by 4 stacked rings of 20S subunits, preventing random protein-enzyme encounter and uncontrolled protein degradation. The 19S regulatory particles can recognize ubiquitin-labeled protein as degradation substrate, unfold the protein to linear, open the gate of 20S core particle, and guide the substrate into the proteolytic chamber. To meet such functional complexity, 19S regulatory particle contains at least 18 constitutive subunits. These subunits can be categorized into two classes based on the ATP dependence of subunits, ATP-dependent subunits and ATP-independent subunits. According to the protein interaction and topological characteristics of this multisubunit complex, the 19S regulatory particle is composed of a base and a lid subcomplex. The base consists of a ring of six AAA ATPases (Subunit Rpt1-6, systematic nomenclature) and four non-ATPase subunits (Rpn1, Rpn2, Rpn10, and Rpn13). Thus, 26S protease regulatory subunit 4 (Rpt2) is an essential component of forming the base subcomplex of 19S regulatory particle. For the assembly of 19S base sub complex, four sets of pivotal assembly chaperons (Hsm3/S5b, Nas2/P27, Nas6/P28, and Rpn14/PAAF1, nomenclature in yeast/mammals) were identified by four groups independently. These 19S regulatory particle base-dedicated chaperons all binds to individual ATPase subunits through the C-terminal regions. For example, Hsm3/S5b binds to the subunit Rpt1 and Rpt2 (this protein), Nas2/p27 to Rpt5, Nas6/p28 to Rpt3, and Rpn14/PAAAF1 to Rpt6, respectively. Subsequently, three intermediate assembly modules are formed as following, the Nas6/p28-Rpt3-Rpt6-Rpn14/PAAF1 module, the Nas2/p27-Rpt4-Rpt5 module, and the Hsm3/S5b-Rpt1-Rpt2-Rpn2 module. Eventually, these three modules assemble together to form the heterohexameric ring of 6 Atlases with Rpn1. The final addition of Rpn13 indicates the completion of 19S base sub complex assembly.

== Function ==
As the degradation machinery that is responsible for ~70% of intracellular proteolysis, proteasome complex (26S proteasome) plays a critical roles in maintaining the homeostasis of cellular proteome. Accordingly, misfolded proteins and damaged protein need to be continuously removed to recycle amino acids for new synthesis; in parallel, some key regulatory proteins fulfill their biological functions via selective degradation; furthermore, proteins are digested into peptides for MHC class I antigen presentation. To meet such complicated demands in biological process via spatial and temporal proteolysis, protein substrates have to be recognized, recruited, and eventually hydrolyzed in a well controlled fashion. Thus, 19S regulatory particle pertains a series of important capabilities to address these functional challenges. To recognize protein as designated substrate, 19S complex has subunits that are capable to recognize proteins with a special degradative tag, the ubiquitinylation. It also have subunits that can bind with nucleotides (e.g., ATPs) in order to facilitate the association between 19S and 20S particles, as well as to cause confirmation changes of alpha subunit C-terminals that form the substrate entrance of 20S complex.

The ATPases subunits assemble into a six-membered ring with a sequence of Rpt1–Rpt5–Rpt4–Rpt3–Rpt6–Rpt2, which interacts with the seven-membered alpha ring of 20S core particle and establishes an asymmetric interface between the 19S RP and the 20S CP. Three C-terminal tails with HbYX motifs of distinct Rpt ATPases insert into pockets between two defined alpha subunits of the CP and regulate the gate opening of the central channels in the CP alpha ring.

== Clinical significance ==
The proteasome and its subunits are of clinical significance for at least two reasons: (1) a compromised complex assembly or a dysfunctional proteasome can be associated with the underlying pathophysiology of specific diseases, and (2) they can be exploited as drug targets for therapeutic interventions. More recently, more effort has been made to consider the proteasome for the development of novel diagnostic markers and strategies. An improved and comprehensive understanding of the pathophysiology of the proteasome should lead to clinical applications in the future.

The proteasomes form a pivotal component for the ubiquitin–proteasome system (UPS) and corresponding cellular Protein Quality Control (PQC). Protein ubiquitination and subsequent proteolysis and degradation by the proteasome are important mechanisms in the regulation of the cell cycle, cell growth and differentiation, gene transcription, signal transduction and apoptosis. Subsequently, a compromised proteasome complex assembly and function lead to reduced proteolytic activities and the accumulation of damaged or misfolded protein species. Such protein accumulation may contribute to the pathogenesis and phenotypic characteristics in neurodegenerative diseases, cardiovascular diseases, inflammatory responses and autoimmune diseases, and systemic DNA damage responses leading to malignancies.

Several experimental and clinical studies have indicated that aberrations and deregulations of the UPS contribute to the pathogenesis of several neurodegenerative and myodegenerative disorders, including Alzheimer's disease, Parkinson's disease and Pick's disease, Amyotrophic lateral sclerosis (ALS), Huntington's disease, Creutzfeldt–Jakob disease, and motor neuron diseases, polyglutamine (PolyQ) diseases, Muscular dystrophies and several rare forms of neurodegenerative diseases associated with dementia. As part of the ubiquitin–proteasome system (UPS), the proteasome maintains cardiac protein homeostasis and thus plays a significant role in cardiac ischemic injury, ventricular hypertrophy and heart failure. Additionally, evidence is accumulating that the UPS plays an essential role in malignant transformation. UPS proteolysis plays a major role in responses of cancer cells to stimulatory signals that are critical for the development of cancer. Accordingly, gene expression by degradation of transcription factors, such as p53, c-jun, c-Fos, NF-κB, c-Myc, HIF-1α, MATα2, STAT3, sterol-regulated element-binding proteins and androgen receptors are all controlled by the UPS and thus involved in the development of various malignancies. Moreover, the UPS regulates the degradation of tumor suppressor gene products such as adenomatous polyposis coli (APC) in colorectal cancer, retinoblastoma (Rb). and von Hippel–Lindau tumor suppressor (VHL), as well as a number of proto-oncogenes (Raf, Myc, Myb, Rel, Src, Mos, ABL). The UPS is also involved in the regulation of inflammatory responses. This activity is usually attributed to the role of proteasomes in the activation of NF-κB which further regulates the expression of pro inflammatory cytokines such as TNF-α, IL-β, IL-8, adhesion molecules (ICAM-1, VCAM-1, P-selectin) and prostaglandins and nitric oxide (NO). Additionally, the UPS also plays a role in inflammatory responses as regulators of leukocyte proliferation, mainly through proteolysis of cyclines and the degradation of CDK inhibitors. Lastly, autoimmune disease patients with SLE, Sjögren syndrome and rheumatoid arthritis (RA) predominantly exhibit circulating proteasomes which can be applied as clinical biomarkers.

In humans the 26S protease regulatory subunit 4', also known as 26S proteasome AAA-ATPase subunit Rpt2, is an enzyme that is encoded by the PSMC1 gene. This protein and is one of the 19 essential subunits of a complete assembled 19S proteasome complex. Megakaryocytes that were isolated from mice deficient for PSMC1 failed to produce pro platelets. The failure to produce proplatelets in proteasome-inhibited megakaryocytes was due to upregulation and hyperactivation of the small GTPase, RhoA. It appears that proteasome function, through an underlying mechanisms involving PSMC1, is critical for thrombopoiesis. Furthermore, inhibition of RhoA signaling in this process may be a potential strategy to treat thrombocytopenia in bortezomib-treated multiple myeloma patients.

== Interactions ==
PSMC1 has been shown to interact with PSMD2 and PSMC2.
