= PSMD10 =

Enzyme found in humans

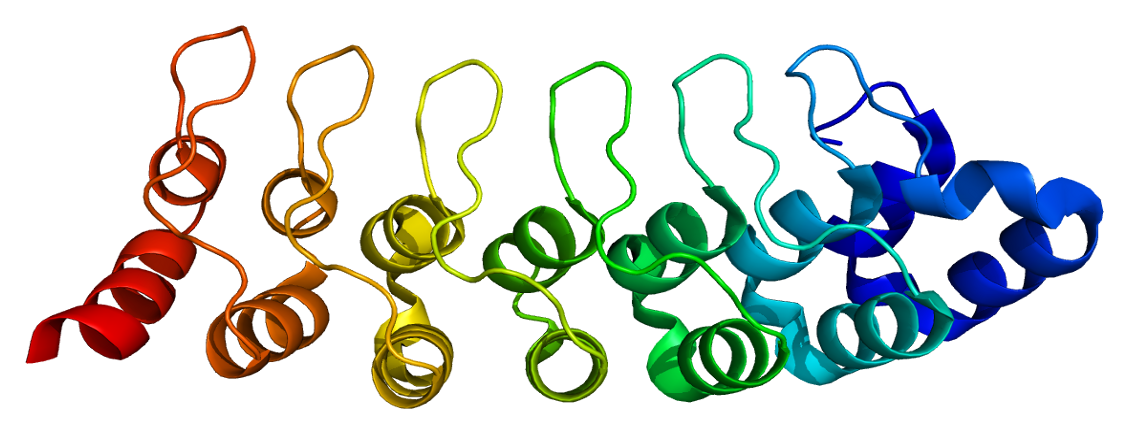

Identifiers
- Aliases: PSMD10, dJ889N15.2, p28, p28(GANK), proteasome 26S subunit, non-ATPase 10
- External IDs: OMIM: 300880; MGI: 1858898; GeneCards: PSMD10
Available structures
| PDB | Ortholog search: PDBe RCSB |
| PDB | List of PDB id codes 1QYM, 1TR4, 1UOH, 4NIK |

Gene location (Human)
| Chr. | X chromosome (human) |
| Band | Xq22.3 | Start | 108,084,207 bp |
| Band | Xq22.3 | End | 108,091,549 bp |

Gene location (Mouse)
| Chr. | X chromosome (mouse) |
| Band | X|X F1 | Start | 139,849,178 bp |
| Band | X|X F1 | End | 139,857,477 bp |
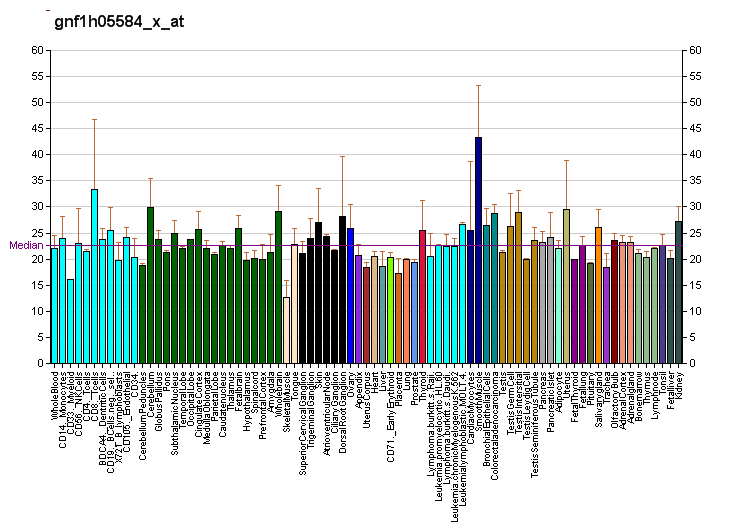

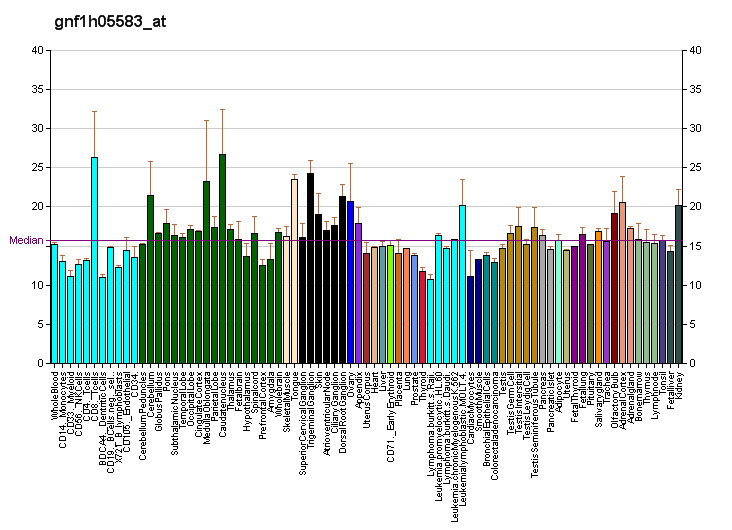

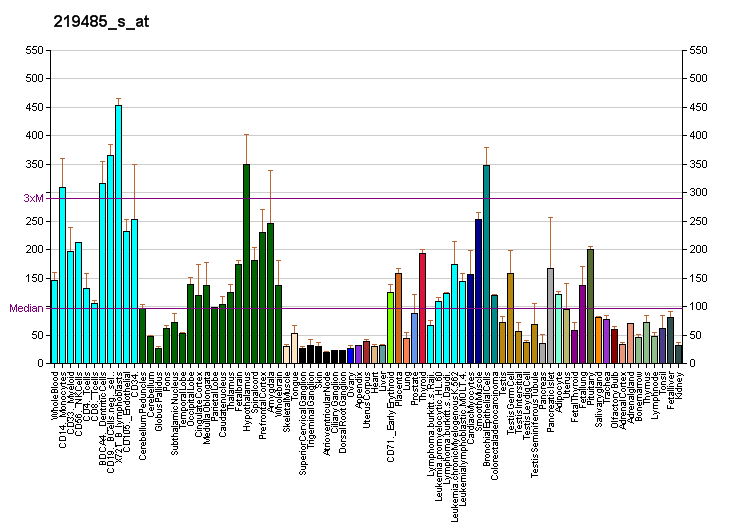
RNA expression pattern
| Bgee | Human / Mouse (ortholog); Top expressed in: epithelium of nasopharynx; ventricular zone; hypothalamus; islet of Langerhans; palpebral conjunctiva; C1 segment; tibia; bronchial epithelial cell; ganglionic eminence; germinal epithelium / Top expressed in: primary oocyte; yolk sac; right kidney; proximal tubule; zygote; secondary oocyte; granulocyte; ileum; lens; neural tube; More reference expression data |
| BioGPS | More reference expression data |
Gene ontology
| Molecular function | transcription factor binding; protein binding |
| Cellular component | intermediate filament cytoskeleton; cytoplasm; nucleoplasm; proteasome regulatory particle, base subcomplex; nucleus; proteasome regulatory particle; proteasome complex; cytosol |
| Biological process | negative regulation of release of cytochrome c from mitochondria; cytoplasmic sequestering of NF-kappaB; positive regulation of cyclin-dependent protein serine/threonine kinase activity; positive regulation of cell growth; negative regulation of transcription by RNA polymerase II; negative regulation of MAPK cascade; negative regulation of DNA damage response, signal transduction by p53 class mediator; proteasome regulatory particle assembly; positive regulation of protein ubiquitination; negative regulation of NF-kappaB transcription factor activity; positive regulation of proteasomal ubiquitin-dependent protein catabolic process; negative regulation of apoptotic process; apoptotic process; protein deubiquitination; post-translational protein modification; MAPK cascade; protein polyubiquitination; stimulatory C-type lectin receptor signaling pathway; antigen processing and presentation of exogenous peptide antigen via MHC class I, TAP-dependent; regulation of cellular amino acid metabolic process; negative regulation of G2/M transition of mitotic cell cycle; anaphase-promoting complex-dependent catabolic process; SCF-dependent proteasomal ubiquitin-dependent protein catabolic process; tumor necrosis factor-mediated signaling pathway; NIK/NF-kappaB signaling; Fc-epsilon receptor signaling pathway; proteasome-mediated ubiquitin-dependent protein catabolic process; regulation of mRNA stability; T cell receptor signaling pathway; transmembrane transport; Wnt signaling pathway, planar cell polarity pathway; regulation of transcription from RNA polymerase II promoter in response to hypoxia; interleukin-1-mediated signaling pathway; negative regulation of canonical Wnt signaling pathway; positive regulation of canonical Wnt signaling pathway; regulation of mitotic cell cycle phase transition; regulation of hematopoietic stem cell differentiation |
Sources:Amigo / QuickGO
Orthologs
| Databases | NCBI: entry; OMA: entry |
| Species | Human | Mouse |
| Entrez | 5716 | 53380 |
| Ensembl | ENSG00000101843 | ENSMUSG00000031429 |
| UniProt | O75832 | Q9Z2X2 |
| RefSeq (mRNA) | NM_170750; NM_002814 | NM_001164177; NM_016883 |
| RefSeq (protein) | NP_002805; NP_736606 | NP_001157649; NP_058579 |
| Location (UCSC) | Chr X: 108.08 – 108.09 Mb | Chr X: 139.85 – 139.86 Mb |
| PubMed search |
- Wikidata
| View/Edit Human | View/Edit Mouse |

26S proteasome non-ATPase regulatory subunit 10 or gankyrin is an enzyme that in humans is encoded by the PSMD10 gene. First isolated in 1998 by Tanaka et al.; Gankyrin is an oncoprotein that is a component of the 19S regulatory cap of the proteasome. Structurally, it contains a 33-amino acid ankyrin repeat that forms a series of alpha helices. It plays a key role in regulating the cell cycle via protein-protein interactions with the cyclin-dependent kinase CDK4. It also binds closely to the E3 ubiquitin ligase MDM2, which is a regulator of the degradation of p53 and retinoblastoma protein, both transcription factors involved in tumor suppression and found mutated in many cancers. Gankyrin also has an anti-apoptotic effect and is overexpressed in certain types of tumor cells such as hepatocellular carcinoma.

== Function ==
The 26S proteasome is a multicatalytic proteinase complex with a highly ordered structure composed of 2 complexes, a 20S core and a 19S regulator. The 20S core is composed of 4 rings of 28 non-identical subunits; 2 rings are composed of 7 alpha subunits and 2 rings are composed of 7 beta subunits. The 19S regulator is composed of a base, which contains 6 ATPase subunits and 2 non-ATPase subunits, and a lid, which contains up to 10 non-ATPase subunits. Proteasomes are distributed throughout eukaryotic cells at a high concentration and cleave peptides in an ATP/ubiquitin-dependent process in a non-lysosomal pathway. An essential function of a modified proteasome, the immunoproteasome, is the processing of class I MHC peptides. This gene encodes a non-ATPase subunit of the 19S regulator. Two transcripts encoding different isoforms have been described. Pseudogenes have been identified on chromosomes 3 and 20.

== Clinical significance ==
The proteasome and its subunits are of clinical significance for at least two reasons: (1) a compromised complex assembly or a dysfunctional proteasome can be associated with the underlying pathophysiology of specific diseases, and (2) they can be exploited as drug targets for therapeutic interventions. More recently, more effort has been made to consider the proteasome for the development of novel diagnostic markers and strategies. An improved and comprehensive understanding of the pathophysiology of the proteasome should lead to clinical applications in the future.

The proteasomes form a pivotal component for the ubiquitin–proteasome system (UPS) and corresponding cellular Protein Quality Control (PQC). Protein ubiquitination and subsequent proteolysis and degradation by the proteasome are important mechanisms in the regulation of the cell cycle, cell growth and differentiation, gene transcription, signal transduction and apoptosis. Subsequently, a compromised proteasome complex assembly and function lead to reduced proteolytic activities and the accumulation of damaged or misfolded protein species. Such protein accumulation may contribute to the pathogenesis and phenotypic characteristics in neurodegenerative diseases, cardiovascular diseases, inflammatory responses and autoimmune diseases, and systemic DNA damage responses leading to malignancies.

Several experimental and clinical studies have indicated that aberrations and deregulations of the UPS contribute to the pathogenesis of several neurodegenerative and myodegenerative disorders, including Alzheimer's disease, Parkinson's disease and Pick's disease, Amyotrophic lateral sclerosis (ALS), Huntington's disease, Creutzfeldt–Jakob disease, and motor neuron diseases, polyglutamine (PolyQ) diseases, Muscular dystrophies and several rare forms of neurodegenerative diseases associated with dementia. As part of the ubiquitin–proteasome system (UPS), the proteasome maintains cardiac protein homeostasis and thus plays a significant role in cardiac ischemic injury, ventricular hypertrophy and heart failure. Additionally, evidence is accumulating that the UPS plays an essential role in malignant transformation. UPS proteolysis plays a major role in responses of cancer cells to stimulatory signals that are critical for the development of cancer. Accordingly, gene expression by degradation of transcription factors, such as p53, c-jun, c-Fos, NF-κB, c-Myc, HIF-1α, MATα2, STAT3, sterol-regulated element-binding proteins and androgen receptors are all controlled by the UPS and thus involved in the development of various malignancies. Moreover, the UPS regulates the degradation of tumor suppressor gene products such as adenomatous polyposis coli (APC) in colorectal cancer, retinoblastoma (Rb). and von Hippel–Lindau tumor suppressor (VHL), as well as a number of proto-oncogenes (Raf, Myc, Myb, Rel, Src, Mos, ABL). The UPS is also involved in the regulation of inflammatory responses. This activity is usually attributed to the role of proteasomes in the activation of NF-κB which further regulates the expression of pro inflammatory cytokines such as TNF-α, IL-β, IL-8, adhesion molecules (ICAM-1, VCAM-1, P-selectin) and prostaglandins and nitric oxide (NO). Additionally, the UPS also plays a role in inflammatory responses as regulators of leukocyte proliferation, mainly through proteolysis of cyclines and the degradation of CDK inhibitors. Lastly, autoimmune disease patients with SLE, Sjögren syndrome and rheumatoid arthritis (RA) predominantly exhibit circulating proteasomes which can be applied as clinical biomarkers.

== Interactions ==
PSMD10 has been shown to interact with:

- Mdm2,
- PAAF1, and
- PSMC4.
