= ADRM1 =

Protein-coding gene in humans

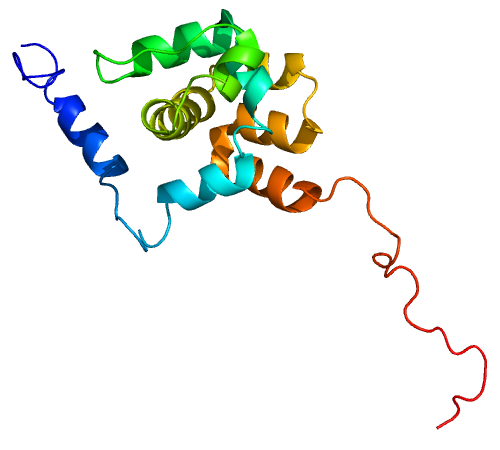

Identifiers
- Aliases: ADRM1, ARM-1, ARM1, GP110, adhesion regulating molecule 1, PSMD16, ADRM1 26S proteasome ubiquitin receptor
- External IDs: OMIM: 610650; MGI: 1929289; GeneCards: ADRM1
Available structures
PDB	Ortholog search: PDBe RCSB
PDB	List of PDB id codes 2KQZ, 2KR0, 2L5V, 2MKZ, 4UEL, 4UEM, 4WLQ, 4WLR, 5IRS

Gene location (Human)
Chr.	Chromosome 20 (human)
Band	20q13.33	Start	62,302,093 bp
Band	20q13.33	End	62,308,862 bp

Gene location (Mouse)
Chr.	Chromosome 2 (mouse)
Band	2|2 H4	Start	179,813,278 bp
Band	2|2 H4	End	179,818,079 bp
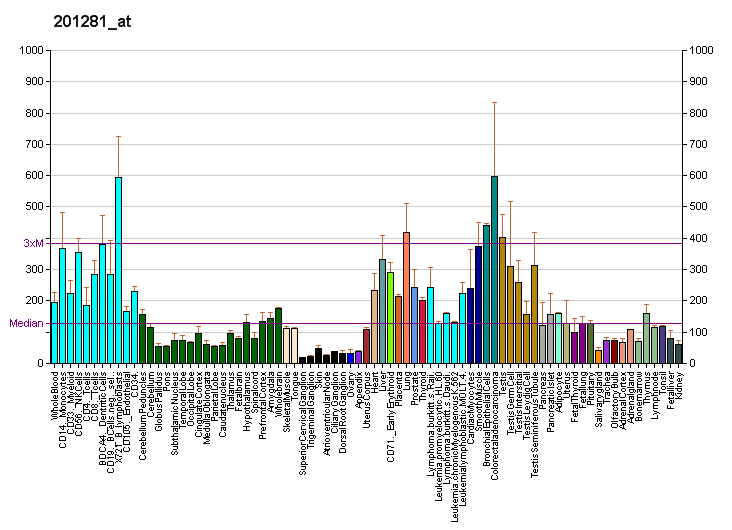
RNA expression pattern
Bgee	Human / Mouse (ortholog); Top expressed in: gastrocnemius muscle; right testis; left testis; muscle of thigh; apex of heart; right hemisphere of cerebellum; right adrenal gland; skin of leg; right adrenal cortex; left adrenal gland / Top expressed in: muscle of thigh; proximal tubule; lip; muscle tissue; neural tube; yolk sac; skeletal muscle tissue; adrenal gland; right kidney; morula; More reference expression data
BioGPS	More reference expression data
Gene ontology
Molecular function	endopeptidase activator activity; protease binding; proteasome binding; protein binding; ubiquitin binding
Cellular component	proteasome complex; plasma membrane; integral component of plasma membrane; membrane; nucleus; nucleoplasm; cytoplasm; cytosol; proteasome regulatory particle, lid subcomplex
Biological process	transcription elongation from RNA polymerase II promoter; proteasome assembly; positive regulation of endopeptidase activity; ubiquitin-dependent protein catabolic process; protein deubiquitination
Sources:Amigo / QuickGO
Orthologs
Databases	NCBI: entry; OMA: entry
Species	Human	Mouse
Entrez	11047	56436
Ensembl	ENSG00000130706	ENSMUSG00000039041
UniProt	Q16186	Q9JKV1
RefSeq (mRNA)	NM_001281437; NM_001281438; NM_007002; NM_175573	NM_019822
RefSeq (protein)	NP_001268366; NP_001268367; NP_008933; NP_783163	NP_062796
Location (UCSC)	Chr 20: 62.3 – 62.31 Mb	Chr 2: 179.81 – 179.82 Mb
PubMed search
- Wikidata
View/Edit Human	View/Edit Mouse

Proteasomal ubiquitin receptor ADRM1 is a protein that in humans is encoded by the ADRM1 gene. Recent evidences on proteasome complex structure confirmed that the protein encoded by gene ADRM1, also known in yeast as 26S Proteasome regulatory subunit Rpn13 (systematic nomenclature for proteasome subunits), is a subunit of 19S proteasome complex.

== Gene ==
The gene ADRM1 encodes one of the non-ATPase subunits of the 19S regulator base, subunit Rpn13. The human PSMD4 gene has 10 exons and locates at chromosome band 20q13.33.The human protein Proteasomal ubiquitin receptor ADRM1 is 42 kDa in size and composed of 407 amino acids. The calculated theoretical pI of this protein is 4.95.

== Structure ==
The protein encoded by this gene is an integral plasma membrane protein which promotes cell adhesion. The encoded protein is thought to undergo O-linked glycosylation. Expression of this gene has been shown to be induced by gamma interferon in some cancer cells. Two transcript variants encoding the same protein have been found for this gene.

=== Complex assembly ===
26S proteasome complex is usually consisted of a 20S core particle (CP, or 20S proteasome) and one or two 19S regulatory particles (RP, or 19S proteasome) on either one side or both side of the barrel-shaped 20S. The CP and RPs pertain distinct structural characteristics and biological functions. In brief, 20S sub complex presents three types proteolytic activities, including caspase-like, trypsin-like, and chymotrypsin-like activities. These proteolytic active sites located in the inner side of a chamber formed by 4 stacked rings of 20S subunits, preventing random protein-enzyme encounter and uncontrolled protein degradation. The 19S regulatory particles can recognize ubiquitin-labeled protein as degradation substrate, unfold the protein to linear, open the gate of 20S core particle, and guide the substrate into the proteolytic chamber. To meet such functional complexity, 19S regulatory particle contains at least 18 constitutive subunits. These subunits can be categorized into two classes based on the ATP dependence of subunits, ATP-dependent subunits and ATP-independent subunits. According to the protein interaction and topological characteristics of this multisubunit complex, the 19S regulatory particle is composed of a base and a lid subcomplex. The base consists of a ring of six AAA ATPases (Subunit Rpt1-6, systematic nomenclature) and four non-ATPase subunits (Rpn1, Rpn2, and Rpn10. Thus, Proteasomal ubiquitin receptor ADRM1 (Rpn13) is an important component of forming the base subcomplex of 19S regulatory particle. Traditional view of Rpn13 is that it is rather an associating partner of proteasome complex than a constitutive subunit. However, emerging evidences suggested that Rpn13 is a novel subunit of 19S. A recent study provided new evidences of 19S complex structure via an integrative approach combining data from cryoelectron microscopy, X-ray crystallography, residue-specific chemical cross-linking, and several proteomics techniques. In the newly established sub complex model of 19S base, Rpn2 is rigid protein located on the side of ATPase ring, supporting as the connection between the lid and base. Rpn1 is conformationally variable, positioned at the periphery of the ATPase ring. The ubiquitin receptors Rpn10 and Rpn13 are located further in the distal part of the 19S complex, indicating that they were recruited to the complex late during the assembly process.

== Function ==
As the degradation machinery that is responsible for ~70% of intracellular proteolysis, proteasome complex (26S proteasome) plays a critical roles in maintaining the homeostasis of cellular proteome. Accordingly, misfolded proteins and damaged protein need to be continuously removed to recycle amino acids for new synthesis; in parallel, some key regulatory proteins fulfill their biological functions via selective degradation; furthermore, proteins are digested into peptides for MHC class I antigen presentation. To meet such complicated demands in biological process via spatial and temporal proteolysis, protein substrates have to be recognized, recruited, and eventually hydrolyzed in a well controlled fashion. Thus, 19S regulatory particle pertains a series of important capabilities to address these functional challenges. To recognize protein as designated substrate, 19S complex has subunits that are capable to recognize proteins with a special degradative tag, the ubiquitinylation. It also have subunits that can bind with nucleotides (e.g., ATPs) in order to facilitate the association between 19S and 20S particles, as well as to cause confirmation changes of alpha subunit C-terminals that form the substrate entrance of 20S complex. Rpn13 is one essential subunit of 19S regulatory particle and it contributes to the assembly of the "base" subcomplex. In the base sub complex, Rpn13, as a ubiquitin receptor, offers a docking position for ubiquitinated substrate. Evidence showed that ubiquitination of Rpn13 subunit can significantly reduced the proteasome's ability to bind and degrade ubiquitin-conjugated proteins. Investigation employing biochemical and unbiased AQUA-MS methodologies offered evidences showing that, although the vast majority (if not all) of the double-capped 26S proteasomes, both 19S complexes, contain the ubiquitin receptor Rpn10, only one of these 19S particles contains the additional ubiquitin receptor Rpn13, thereby defining asymmetry in the 26S proteasome. Such structural asymmetry might be the molecular foundation for the one-directional substrate feeding process of proteasome complex.
