= PSMD2 =

Enzyme found in humans

Identifiers
- Aliases: PSMD2, P97, RPN1, S2, TRAP2, proteasome 26S subunit, non-ATPase 2, proteasome 26S subunit ubiquitin receptor, non-ATPase 2
- External IDs: OMIM: 606223; MGI: 1096584; GeneCards: PSMD2

Gene location (Human)
Chr.	Chromosome 3 (human)
Band	3q27.1	Start	184,299,198 bp
Band	3q27.1	End	184,309,050 bp

Gene location (Mouse)
Chr.	Chromosome 16 (mouse)
Band	16|16 A3	Start	20,470,402 bp
Band	16|16 A3	End	20,482,164 bp
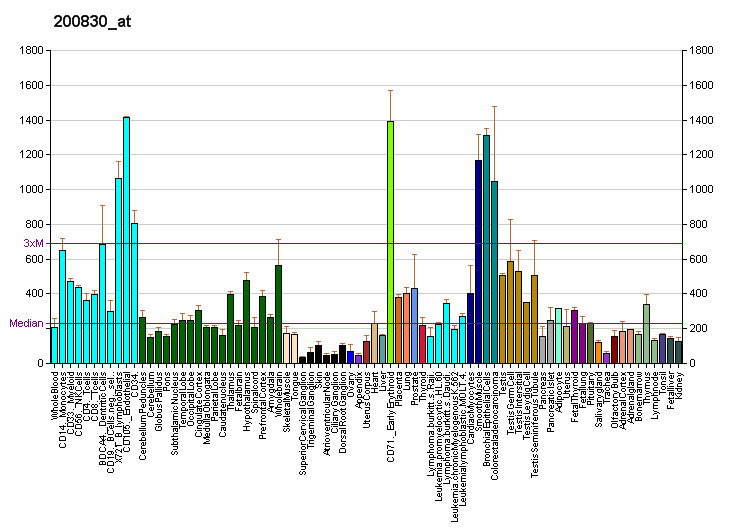
RNA expression pattern
Bgee	Human / Mouse (ortholog); Top expressed in: secondary oocyte; endothelial cell; stromal cell of endometrium; right testis; gastrocnemius muscle; left testis; muscle of thigh; glutes; islet of Langerhans; right adrenal gland / Top expressed in: yolk sac; muscle of thigh; ventricular zone; dentate gyrus of hippocampal formation granule cell; genital tubercle; blastocyst; tail of embryo; esophagus; spermatocyte; morula; More reference expression data
BioGPS	More reference expression data
Gene ontology
Molecular function	enzyme regulator activity; protein binding; endopeptidase activity
Cellular component	cytosol; membrane; nucleoplasm; proteasome complex; extracellular exosome; extracellular region; proteasome regulatory particle; proteasome accessory complex; secretory granule lumen; ficolin-1-rich granule lumen; nucleus; proteasome regulatory particle, base subcomplex; proteasome storage granule
Biological process	regulation of cellular amino acid metabolic process; antigen processing and presentation of exogenous peptide antigen via MHC class I, TAP-dependent; regulation of mRNA stability; positive regulation of canonical Wnt signaling pathway; protein polyubiquitination; stimulatory C-type lectin receptor signaling pathway; tumor necrosis factor-mediated signaling pathway; MAPK cascade; Fc-epsilon receptor signaling pathway; NIK/NF-kappaB signaling; regulation of protein catabolic process; anaphase-promoting complex-dependent catabolic process; T cell receptor signaling pathway; negative regulation of canonical Wnt signaling pathway; Wnt signaling pathway, planar cell polarity pathway; negative regulation of G2/M transition of mitotic cell cycle; protein deubiquitination; SCF-dependent proteasomal ubiquitin-dependent protein catabolic process; neutrophil degranulation; transmembrane transport; regulation of transcription from RNA polymerase II promoter in response to hypoxia; post-translational protein modification; proteasome-mediated ubiquitin-dependent protein catabolic process; regulation of hematopoietic stem cell differentiation; regulation of catalytic activity; interleukin-1-mediated signaling pathway; regulation of mitotic cell cycle phase transition
Sources:Amigo / QuickGO
Orthologs
Databases	NCBI: entry; OMA: entry
Species	Human	Mouse
Entrez	5708	21762
Ensembl	ENSG00000175166	ENSMUSG00000006998
UniProt	Q13200	Q8VDM4
RefSeq (mRNA)	NM_002808; NM_001278708; NM_001278709	NM_134101
RefSeq (protein)	NP_001265637; NP_001265638; NP_002799	NP_598862
Location (UCSC)	Chr 3: 184.3 – 184.31 Mb	Chr 16: 20.47 – 20.48 Mb
PubMed search
- Wikidata
View/Edit Human	View/Edit Mouse

26S proteasome non-ATPase regulatory subunit 2, also as known as 26S Proteasome Regulatory Subunit Rpn1 (systematic nomenclature), is an enzyme that in humans is encoded by the PSMD2 gene.

== Structure ==
=== Gene expression ===
The gene PSMD2 encodes a non-ATPase subunit of the 19S regulator base, which is responsible for substrate recognition and binding. The gene PSMD2 encodes one of the non-ATPase subunits of the 19S regulator lid. In addition to participation in proteasome function, this subunit may also participate in the TNF signalling pathway since it interacts with the tumor necrosis factor type 1 receptor. A pseudogene has been identified on chromosome 1. The human PSMD2 gene has 23 exons and locates at chromosome band 3q27.1. The human protein 26S proteasome non-ATPase regulatory subunit 2 is 100 kDa in size and composed of 909 amino acids. The calculated theoretical pI of this protein is 5.10. Two expression isoforms are generated by alternative splicing, in which either 1-130 or 1-163 of the amino acid sequence is missing.

=== Complex assembly ===
26S proteasome complex is usually consisted of a 20S core particle (CP, or 20S proteasome) and one or two 19S regulatory particles (RP, or 19S proteasome) on either one side or both side of the barrel-shaped 20S. The CP and RPs pertain distinct structural characteristics and biological functions. In brief, 20S sub complex presents three types proteolytic activities, including caspase-like, trypsin-like, and chymotrypsin-like activities. These proteolytic active sites located in the inner side of a chamber formed by 4 stacked rings of 20S subunits, preventing random protein-enzyme encounter and uncontrolled protein degradation. The 19S regulatory particles can recognize ubiquitin-labeled protein as degradation substrate, unfold the protein to linear, open the gate of 20S core particle, and guide the substrate into the proteolytic chamber. To meet such functional complexity, 19S regulatory particle contains at least 18 constitutive subunits. These subunits can be categorized into two classes based on the ATP dependence of subunits, ATP-dependent subunits and ATP-independent subunits. According to the protein interaction and topological characteristics of this multisubunit complex, the 19S regulatory particle is composed of a base and a lid subcomplex. The base consists of a ring of six AAA ATPases (Subunit Rpt1-6, systematic nomenclature) and four non-ATPase subunits (Rpn1, Rpn2, Rpn10, and Rpn13). Thus, Protein 26S proteasome non-ATPase regulatory subunit 2 (Rpn1) is an essential component of forming the base subcomplex of 19S regulatory particle. Traditionally, Rpn1 and Rpn2 were considered residing at the center of base sub complex and surrounded by six AAA ATPases (Rpt 1-6). However, recent investigation provides an alternative structure of 19S base via an integrative approach combining data from cryoelectron microscopy, X-ray crystallography, residue-specific chemical cross-linking, and several proteomics techniques. Rpn2 is rigid protein located on the side of ATPase ring, supporting as the connection between the lid and base. Rpn1 is conformationally variable, positioned at the periphery of the ATPase ring. The ubiquitin receptors Rpn10 and Rpn13 are located further in the distal part of the 19S complex, indicating that they were recruited to the complex late during the assembly process.

== Function ==
As the degradation machinery that is responsible for ~70% of intracellular proteolysis, proteasome complex (26S proteasome) plays a critical roles in maintaining the homeostasis of cellular proteome. Accordingly, misfolded proteins and damaged protein need to be continuously removed to recycle amino acids for new synthesis; in parallel, some key regulatory proteins fulfill their biological functions via selective degradation; furthermore, proteins are digested into peptides for MHC class I antigen presentation. To meet such complicated demands in biological process via spatial and temporal proteolysis, protein substrates have to be recognized, recruited, and eventually hydrolyzed in a well controlled fashion. Thus, 19S regulatory particle pertains a series of important capabilities to address these functional challenges. To recognize protein as designated substrate, 19S complex has subunits that are capable to recognize proteins with a special degradative tag, the ubiquitinylation. It also have subunits that can bind with nucleotides (e.g., ATPs) in order to facilitate the association between 19S and 20S particles, as well as to cause confirmation changes of alpha subunit C-terminals that form the substrate entrance of 20S complex. Rpn1 is one essential subunit of 19S regulatory particle and it forms the core of the "base" subcomplex. It offers a docking position for another 19S subunit Rpn10 at its central solenoid portion, although such association with Rpn10 is stabilized by a third subunit, Rpn2. Besides its critical roles in 19S complex assembly, Rpn2 also provides docking positions for shuttles of ubiqitinylated substrate trafficking. The majority of shuttles attach to the proteasome via a ubiquitin-like domain (UBL) while they unload the substrate cargo at a C-terminal polyubiquitin-binding domain(s). Recent investigation by Glickman et al. identified that two shuttle proteins, Rad23 and Dsk2, dock at two different receptor sites embedded within subunit Rpn1.

== Clinical significance ==
The proteasome and its subunits are of clinical significance for at least two reasons: (1) a compromised complex assembly or a dysfunctional proteasome can be associated with the underlying pathophysiology of specific diseases, and (2) they can be exploited as drug targets for therapeutic interventions. More recently, more effort has been made to consider the proteasome for the development of novel diagnostic markers and strategies. An improved and comprehensive understanding of the pathophysiology of the proteasome should lead to clinical applications in the future.

The proteasomes form a pivotal component for the ubiquitin–proteasome system (UPS) and corresponding cellular Protein Quality Control (PQC). Protein ubiquitination and subsequent proteolysis and degradation by the proteasome are important mechanisms in the regulation of the cell cycle, cell growth and differentiation, gene transcription, signal transduction and apoptosis. Subsequently, a compromised proteasome complex assembly and function lead to reduced proteolytic activities and the accumulation of damaged or misfolded protein species. Such protein accumulation may contribute to the pathogenesis and phenotypic characteristics in neurodegenerative diseases, cardiovascular diseases, inflammatory responses and autoimmune diseases, and systemic DNA damage responses leading to malignancies.

Several experimental and clinical studies have indicated that aberrations and deregulations of the UPS contribute to the pathogenesis of several neurodegenerative and myodegenerative disorders, including Alzheimer's disease, Parkinson's disease and Pick's disease, Amyotrophic lateral sclerosis (ALS), Huntington's disease, Creutzfeldt–Jakob disease, and motor neuron diseases, polyglutamine (PolyQ) diseases, Muscular dystrophies and several rare forms of neurodegenerative diseases associated with dementia. As part of the ubiquitin–proteasome system (UPS), the proteasome maintains cardiac protein homeostasis and thus plays a significant role in cardiac ischemic injury, ventricular hypertrophy and Heart failure. Additionally, evidence is accumulating that the UPS plays an essential role in malignant transformation. UPS proteolysis plays a major role in responses of cancer cells to stimulatory signals that are critical for the development of cancer. Accordingly, gene expression by degradation of transcription factors, such as p53, c-jun, c-Fos, NF-κB, c-Myc, HIF-1α, MATα2, STAT3, sterol-regulated element-binding proteins and androgen receptors are all controlled by the UPS and thus involved in the development of various malignancies. Moreover, the UPS regulates the degradation of tumor suppressor gene products such as adenomatous polyposis coli (APC) in colorectal cancer, retinoblastoma (Rb). and von Hippel–Lindau tumor suppressor (VHL), as well as a number of proto-oncogenes (Raf, Myc, Myb, Rel, Src, Mos, ABL). The UPS is also involved in the regulation of inflammatory responses. This activity is usually attributed to the role of proteasomes in the activation of NF-κB which further regulates the expression of pro inflammatory cytokines such as TNF-α, IL-β, IL-8, adhesion molecules (ICAM-1, VCAM-1, P-selectin) and prostaglandins and nitric oxide (NO). Additionally, the UPS also plays a role in inflammatory responses as regulators of leukocyte proliferation, mainly through proteolysis of cyclines and the degradation of CDK inhibitors. Lastly, autoimmune disease patients with SLE, Sjögren syndrome and rheumatoid arthritis (RA) predominantly exhibit circulating proteasomes which can be applied as clinical biomarkers.

The protein 26S proteasome non-ATPase regulatory subunit 2 (Rpn1) which is encoded by PSMD2 has been identified as an important constituent of a signature associated with the acquisition of metastatic phenotype and poor prognosis in lung cancers. It was found that knockdown of PSMD2 decreased proteasome activity, and induced growth inhibition and apoptosis in lung cancer cell lines. These effects of siRNA-mediated PSMD2 inhibition were associated with changes in the balance between phosphorylated AKT and p38, as well as with the induction of p21. In addition, patients with higher PSMD2 expression indicated a poorer prognosis and a small fraction of lung cancer specimens carried increased copies of PSMD2. Notably, findings illustrate that lung adenocarcinomas can be divided into two main groups; those with and without general upregulation of proteasome pathway genes including PSMD2.

== Interactions ==
PSMD2 has been shown to interact with TNFRSF1A and PSMC1.
