= PSMD4 =

Enzyme found in humans

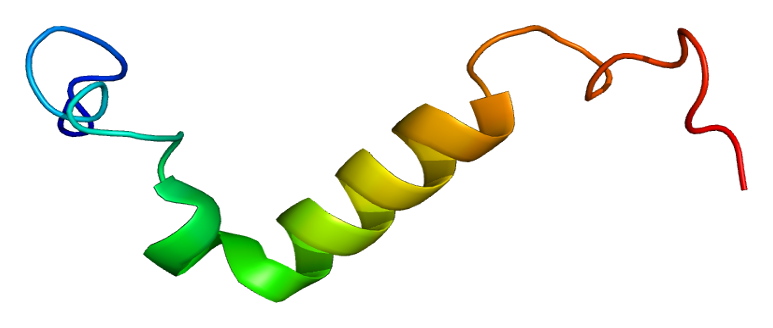

Identifiers
- Aliases: PSMD4, AF, AF-1, ASF, MCB1, Rpn10, S5A, pUB-R5, proteasome 26S subunit, non-ATPase 4, proteasome 26S subunit ubiquitin receptor, non-ATPase 4
- External IDs: OMIM: 601648; MGI: 1201670; GeneCards: PSMD4
Available structures
PDB	Ortholog search: PDBe RCSB
PDB	List of PDB id codes 1P9C, 1P9D, 1UEL, 1YX4, 1YX5, 1YX6, 2KDE, 2KDF

Gene location (Human)
Chr.	Chromosome 1 (human)
Band	1q21.3	Start	151,254,709 bp
Band	1q21.3	End	151,267,479 bp

Gene location (Mouse)
Chr.	Chromosome 3 (mouse)
Band	3 F2.1|3 40.74 cM	Start	94,940,005 bp
Band	3 F2.1|3 40.74 cM	End	94,949,925 bp
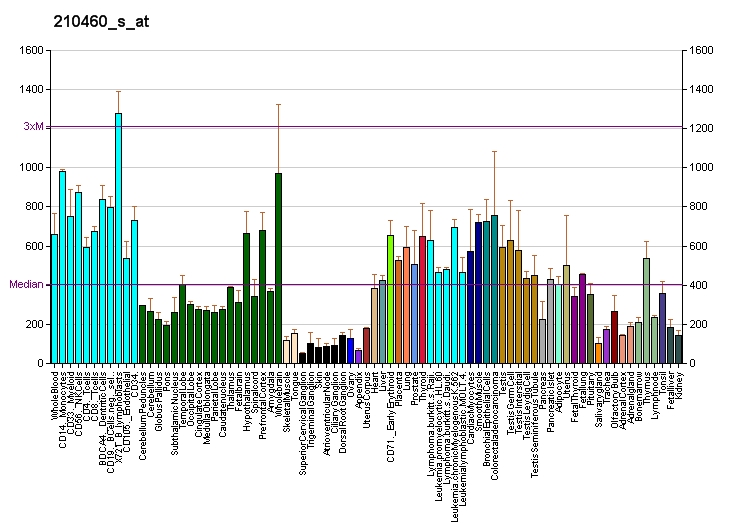

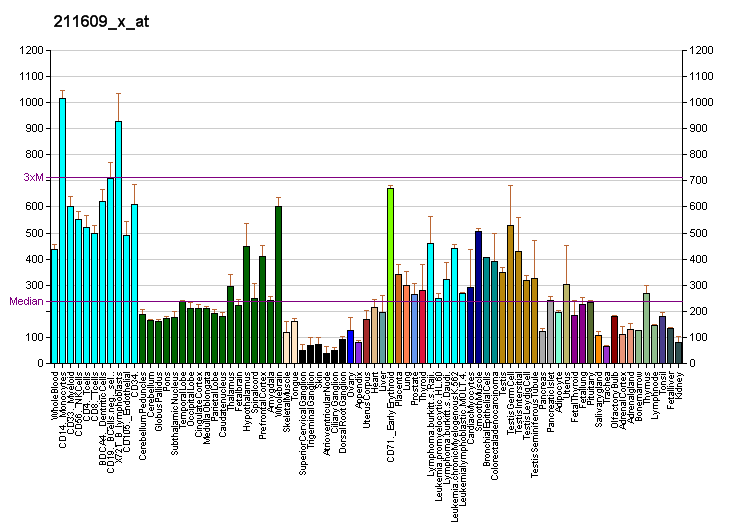

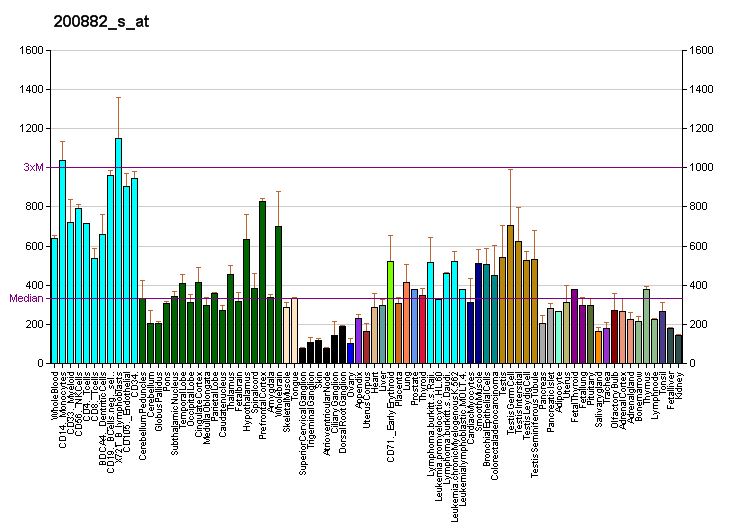
RNA expression pattern
Bgee	Human / Mouse (ortholog); Top expressed in: apex of heart; left testis; right testis; gastrocnemius muscle; muscle of thigh; right frontal lobe; muscle layer of sigmoid colon; amygdala; C1 segment; monocyte / Top expressed in: yolk sac; muscle of thigh; abdominal wall; facial motor nucleus; mandibular prominence; maxillary prominence; temporal muscle; lens; medial head of gastrocnemius muscle; choroid plexus of fourth ventricle; More reference expression data
BioGPS	More reference expression data
Gene ontology
Molecular function	polyubiquitin modification-dependent protein binding; protein binding; identical protein binding; RNA binding
Cellular component	nucleoplasm; proteasome complex; nucleus; cytosol; proteasome accessory complex; proteasome regulatory particle, base subcomplex
Biological process	regulation of cellular amino acid metabolic process; antigen processing and presentation of exogenous peptide antigen via MHC class I, TAP-dependent; regulation of mRNA stability; positive regulation of canonical Wnt signaling pathway; protein polyubiquitination; stimulatory C-type lectin receptor signaling pathway; tumor necrosis factor-mediated signaling pathway; MAPK cascade; Fc-epsilon receptor signaling pathway; NIK/NF-kappaB signaling; anaphase-promoting complex-dependent catabolic process; T cell receptor signaling pathway; negative regulation of canonical Wnt signaling pathway; proteasome assembly; proteasome-mediated ubiquitin-dependent protein catabolic process; Wnt signaling pathway, planar cell polarity pathway; negative regulation of G2/M transition of mitotic cell cycle; protein deubiquitination; SCF-dependent proteasomal ubiquitin-dependent protein catabolic process; transmembrane transport; regulation of transcription from RNA polymerase II promoter in response to hypoxia; post-translational protein modification; regulation of hematopoietic stem cell differentiation; ubiquitin-dependent protein catabolic process; interleukin-1-mediated signaling pathway; regulation of mitotic cell cycle phase transition
Sources:Amigo / QuickGO
Orthologs
Databases	NCBI: entry; OMA: entry
Species	Human	Mouse
Entrez	5710	19185
Ensembl	ENSG00000159352	ENSMUSG00000005625
UniProt	P55036	O35226
RefSeq (mRNA)	NM_002810; NM_153822; NM_001330692	NM_001282017; NM_008951
RefSeq (protein)	NP_001317621; NP_002801	NP_001268946; NP_032977
Location (UCSC)	Chr 1: 151.25 – 151.27 Mb	Chr 3: 94.94 – 94.95 Mb
PubMed search
- Wikidata
View/Edit Human	View/Edit Mouse

26S proteasome non-ATPase regulatory subunit 4, also as known as 26S Proteasome Regulatory Subunit Rpn10 (systematic nomenclature), is an enzyme that in humans is encoded by the PSMD4 gene. This protein is one of the 19 essential subunits that contributes to the complete assembly of 19S proteasome complex.

== Gene ==
The gene PSMD4 encodes one of the non-ATPase subunits of the 19S regulator base, subunit Rpn10. Pseudogenes have been identified on chromosomes 10 and 21. The human PSMD4 gene has 10 exons and locates at chromosome band 1q21.3.

== Protein ==
The human protein 26S proteasome non-ATPase regulatory subunit 4 is 41 kDa in size and composed of 377 amino acids. The calculated theoretical pI of this protein is 4.68. An alternative splicing during gene expression generates an isoform of the protein in which the amino acid sequence from 269 to 377 is missing while the amino sequence between 255 and 268 is replaced from DSDDALLKMTISQQ to GERGGIRSPGTAGC.

== Complex assembly ==
26S proteasome complex is usually consisted of a 20S core particle (CP, or 20S proteasome) and one or two 19S regulatory particles (RP, or 19S proteasome) on either one side or both side of the barrel-shaped 20S. The CP and RPs pertain distinct structural characteristics and biological functions. In brief, 20S sub complex presents three types proteolytic activities, including caspase-like, trypsin-like, and chymotrypsin-like activities. These proteolytic active sites located in the inner side of a chamber formed by 4 stacked rings of 20S subunits, preventing random protein-enzyme encounter and uncontrolled protein degradation. The 19S regulatory particles can recognize ubiquitin-labeled protein as degradation substrate, unfold the protein to linear, open the gate of 20S core particle, and guide the substrate into the proteolytic chamber. To meet such functional complexity, 19S regulatory particle contains at least 18 constitutive subunits. These subunits can be categorized into two classes based on the ATP dependence of subunits, ATP-dependent subunits and ATP-independent subunits. According to the protein interaction and topological characteristics of this multisubunit complex, the 19S regulatory particle is composed of a base and a lid subcomplex. The base consists of a ring of six AAA ATPases (Subunit Rpt1-6, systematic nomenclature) and four non-ATPase subunits (Rpn1, Rpn2, Rpn10, and Rpn13). Thus, protein 26S proteasome non-ATPase regulatory subunit 2 (Rpn1) is an essential component of forming the base subcomplex of 19S regulatory particle. Traditionally, Rpn10 were considered residing between the base subcomplex and the lid subcomplex. However, recent investigation provides an alternative structure of 19S base via an integrative approach combining data from cryoelectron microscopy, X-ray crystallography, residue-specific chemical cross-linking, and several proteomics techniques. Rpn2 is rigid protein located on the side of ATPase ring, supporting as the connection between the lid and base. Rpn1 is conformationally variable, positioned at the periphery of the ATPase ring. The ubiquitin receptors Rpn10 and Rpn13 are located further in the distal part of the 19S complex, indicating that they were recruited to the complex late during the assembly process.

== Function ==
As the degradation machinery that is responsible for ~70% of intracellular proteolysis, proteasome complex (26S proteasome) plays a critical roles in maintaining the homeostasis of cellular proteome. Accordingly, misfolded proteins and damaged protein need to be continuously removed to recycle amino acids for new synthesis; in parallel, some key regulatory proteins fulfill their biological functions via selective degradation; furthermore, proteins are digested into peptides for MHC class I antigen presentation. To meet such complicated demands in biological process via spatial and temporal proteolysis, protein substrates have to be recognized, recruited, and eventually hydrolyzed in a well controlled fashion. Thus, 19S regulatory particle pertains a series of important capabilities to address these functional challenges. To recognize protein as designated substrate, 19S complex has subunits that are capable to recognize proteins with a special degradative tag, the ubiquitinylation. It also has subunits that can bind with nucleotides (e.g., ATPs) in order to facilitate the association between 19S and 20S particles, as well as to cause confirmation changes of alpha subunit C-terminals that form the substrate entrance of 20S complex. Rpn10 is one essential subunit of 19S regulatory particle and it contributes to the assembly of the "base" subcomplex. In the base sub complex, Rpn1 offers a docking position for subunit Rpn10 at its central solenoid portion, although such association with Rpn10 is stabilized by a third subunit, Rpn2. Rpn10 serve as a receptor for poly-ubiquitylated protein substrates.

== Clinical significance ==
The proteasome and its subunits are of clinical significance for at least two reasons: (1) a compromised complex assembly or a dysfunctional proteasome can be associated with the underlying pathophysiology of specific diseases, and (2) they can be exploited as drug targets for therapeutic interventions. More recently, more effort has been made to consider the proteasome for the development of novel diagnostic markers and strategies. An improved and comprehensive understanding of the pathophysiology of the proteasome should lead to clinical applications in the future.

The proteasomes form a pivotal component for the ubiquitin–proteasome system (UPS) and corresponding cellular Protein Quality Control (PQC). Protein ubiquitination and subsequent proteolysis and degradation by the proteasome are important mechanisms in the regulation of the cell cycle, cell growth and differentiation, gene transcription, signal transduction and apoptosis. Subsequently, a compromised proteasome complex assembly and function lead to reduced proteolytic activities and the accumulation of damaged or misfolded protein species. Such protein accumulation may contribute to the pathogenesis and phenotypic characteristics in neurodegenerative diseases, cardiovascular diseases, inflammatory responses and autoimmune diseases, and systemic DNA damage responses leading to malignancies.

Several experimental and clinical studies have indicated that aberrations and deregulations of the UPS contribute to the pathogenesis of several neurodegenerative and myodegenerative disorders, including Alzheimer's disease, Parkinson's disease and Pick's disease, Amyotrophic lateral sclerosis (ALS), Huntington's disease, Creutzfeldt–Jakob disease, and motor neuron diseases, polyglutamine (PolyQ) diseases, Muscular dystrophies and several rare forms of neurodegenerative diseases associated with dementia. As part of the ubiquitin–proteasome system (UPS), the proteasome maintains cardiac protein homeostasis and thus plays a significant role in cardiac ischemic injury, ventricular hypertrophy and heart failure. Additionally, evidence is accumulating that the UPS plays an essential role in malignant transformation. UPS proteolysis plays a major role in responses of cancer cells to stimulatory signals that are critical for the development of cancer. Accordingly, gene expression by degradation of transcription factors, such as p53, c-jun, c-Fos, NF-κB, c-Myc, HIF-1α, MATα2, STAT3, sterol-regulated element-binding proteins and androgen receptors are all controlled by the UPS and thus involved in the development of various malignancies. Moreover, the UPS regulates the degradation of tumor suppressor gene products such as adenomatous polyposis coli (APC) in colorectal cancer, retinoblastoma (Rb). and von Hippel–Lindau tumor suppressor (VHL), as well as a number of proto-oncogenes (Raf, Myc, Myb, Rel, Src, Mos, ABL). The UPS is also involved in the regulation of inflammatory responses. This activity is usually attributed to the role of proteasomes in the activation of NF-κB which further regulates the expression of pro inflammatory cytokines such as TNF-α, IL-β, IL-8, adhesion molecules (ICAM-1, VCAM-1, P-selectin) and prostaglandins and nitric oxide (NO). Additionally, the UPS also plays a role in inflammatory responses as regulators of leukocyte proliferation, mainly through proteolysis of cyclines and the degradation of CDK inhibitors. Lastly, autoimmune disease patients with SLE, Sjögren syndrome and rheumatoid arthritis (RA) predominantly exhibit circulating proteasomes which can be applied as clinical biomarkers.

== Interactions ==
PSMD4 has been shown to interact with RAD23A and RAD23B.
