= PSMD1 =

Protein found in humans

Identifiers
- Aliases: PSMD1, P112, Rpn2, S1, proteasome 26S subunit, non-ATPase 1
- External IDs: OMIM: 617842; MGI: 1917497; GeneCards: PSMD1

Gene location (Human)
| Chr. | Chromosome 2 (human) |
| Band | 2q37.1 | Start | 231,056,845 bp |
| Band | 2q37.1 | End | 231,173,116 bp |

Gene location (Mouse)
| Chr. | Chromosome 1 (mouse) |
| Band | 1|1 C5 | Start | 85,992,109 bp |
| Band | 1|1 C5 | End | 86,066,873 bp |
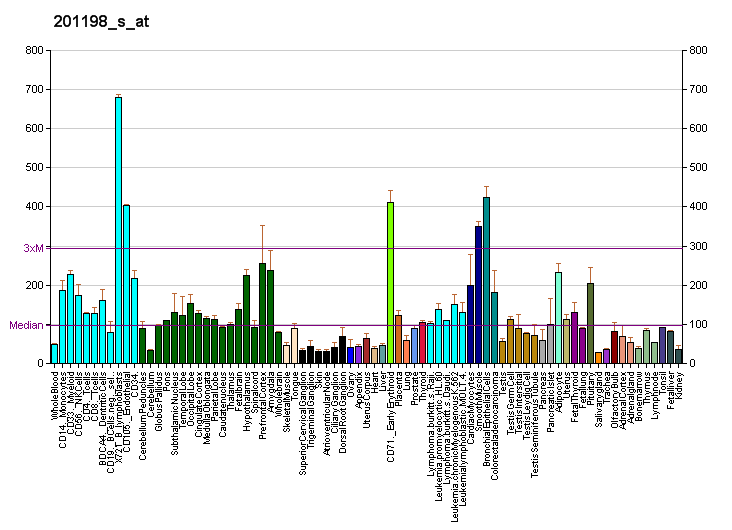

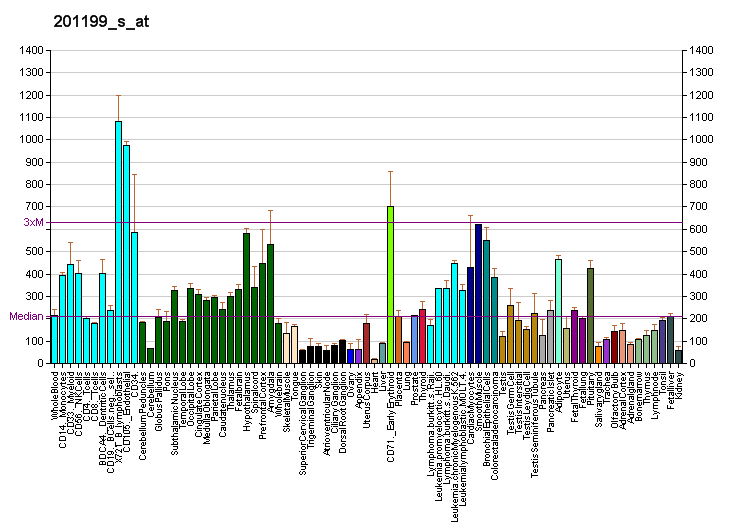
RNA expression pattern
| Bgee | Human / Mouse (ortholog); Top expressed in: tendon of biceps brachii; secondary oocyte; gastrocnemius muscle; deltoid muscle; tibialis anterior muscle; glutes; Skeletal muscle tissue of rectus abdominis; stromal cell of endometrium; internal globus pallidus; mucosa of transverse colon / Top expressed in: primitive streak; facial motor nucleus; maxillary prominence; ankle; endothelial cell of lymphatic vessel; anterior horn of spinal cord; mandibular prominence; hair follicle; somite; epithelium of lens; More reference expression data |
| BioGPS | More reference expression data |
Gene ontology
| Molecular function | enzyme regulator activity; endopeptidase activity; protein binding; ubiquitin protein ligase binding |
| Cellular component | cytosol; membrane; proteasome regulatory particle; nucleoplasm; proteasome complex; extracellular exosome; extracellular region; azurophil granule lumen; nucleus; proteasome regulatory particle, base subcomplex; proteasome storage granule; proteasome accessory complex |
| Biological process | regulation of cellular amino acid metabolic process; antigen processing and presentation of exogenous peptide antigen via MHC class I, TAP-dependent; regulation of mRNA stability; positive regulation of canonical Wnt signaling pathway; protein polyubiquitination; stimulatory C-type lectin receptor signaling pathway; tumor necrosis factor-mediated signaling pathway; MAPK cascade; Fc-epsilon receptor signaling pathway; NIK/NF-kappaB signaling; regulation of protein catabolic process; anaphase-promoting complex-dependent catabolic process; T cell receptor signaling pathway; negative regulation of canonical Wnt signaling pathway; Wnt signaling pathway, planar cell polarity pathway; negative regulation of G2/M transition of mitotic cell cycle; protein deubiquitination; SCF-dependent proteasomal ubiquitin-dependent protein catabolic process; neutrophil degranulation; transmembrane transport; regulation of transcription from RNA polymerase II promoter in response to hypoxia; post-translational protein modification; proteasome-mediated ubiquitin-dependent protein catabolic process; regulation of hematopoietic stem cell differentiation; regulation of catalytic activity; interleukin-1-mediated signaling pathway; regulation of mitotic cell cycle phase transition |
Sources:Amigo / QuickGO
Orthologs
| Databases | NCBI: entry; OMA: entry |
| Species | Human | Mouse |
| Entrez | 5707 | 70247 |
| Ensembl | ENSG00000173692 | ENSMUSG00000026229 |
| UniProt | Q99460 | Q3TXS7 |
| RefSeq (mRNA) | NM_001191037; NM_002807 | NM_027357 |
| RefSeq (protein) | NP_001177966; NP_002798 | NP_081633 |
| Location (UCSC) | Chr 2: 231.06 – 231.17 Mb | Chr 1: 85.99 – 86.07 Mb |
| PubMed search |
- Wikidata
| View/Edit Human | View/Edit Mouse |

26S proteasome non-ATPase regulatory subunit 1, also as known as 26S Proteasome Regulatory Subunit Rpn2 (systematic nomenclature), is a protein that in humans is encoded by the PSMD1 gene. This protein is one of the 19 essential subunits that contributes to the complete assembly of 19S proteasome complex.

== Structure ==
=== Gene expression ===
The gene PSMD1 encodes the largest non-ATPase subunit of the 19S regulator base, which is responsible for substrate recognition and binding. The human PSMD1 gene has 25 exons and locates at chromosome band 2q37.1. The human protein 26S proteasome non-ATPase regulatory subunit 1 is 106 kDa in size and composed of 953 amino acids. The calculated theoretical pI of this protein is 5.25. An alternative splicing during gene expression generates an isoform of the protein in which the amino acid sequence from 797-827 is missing.

=== Complex assembly ===
26S proteasome complex is usually consisted of a 20S core particle (CP, or 20S proteasome) and one or two 19S regulatory particles (RP, or 19S proteasome) on either one side or both side of the barrel-shaped 20S. The CP and RPs pertain distinct structural characteristics and biological functions. In brief, 20S sub complex presents three types proteolytic activities, including caspase-like, trypsin-like, and chymotrypsin-like activities. These proteolytic active sites located in the inner side of a chamber formed by 4 stacked rings of 20S subunits, preventing random protein-enzyme encounter and uncontrolled protein degradation. The 19S regulatory particles can recognize ubiquitin-labeled protein as degradation substrate, unfold the protein to linear, open the gate of 20S core particle, and guide the substrate into the proteolytic chamber. To meet such functional complexity, 19S regulatory particle contains at least 18 constitutive subunits. These subunits can be categorized into two classes based on the ATP dependence of subunits, ATP-dependent subunits and ATP-independent subunits. According to the protein interaction and topological characteristics of this multisubunit complex, the 19S regulatory particle is composed of a base and a lid subcomplex. The base consists of a ring of six AAA ATPases (Subunit Rpt1-6, systematic nomenclature) and four non-ATPase subunits (Rpn1, Rpn2, Rpn10, and Rpn13). Protein 26S proteasome non-ATPase regulatory subunit 1 (Rpn2) is an essential component of forming the base sub complex of 19S regulatory particle. Traditionally, Rpn1 and Rpn2 were considered residing at the center of base sub complex and surrounded by six AAA ATPases (Rpt 1-6). However, recent investigation provides an alternative structure of 19S base via an integrative approach combining data from cryoelectron microscopy, X-ray crystallography, residue-specific chemical cross-linking, and several proteomics techniques. Rpn2 is rigid protein located on the side of ATPase ring, supporting as the connection between the lid and base. Rpn1 is conformationally variable, positioned at the periphery of the ATPase ring. The ubiquitin receptors Rpn10 and Rpn13 are located further in the distal part of the 19S complex, indicating that they were recruited to the complex late during the assembly process.

== Function ==
As the degradation machinery that is responsible for ~70% of intracellular proteolysis, proteasome complex (26S proteasome) plays a critical roles in maintaining the homeostasis of cellular proteome. Accordingly, misfolded proteins and damaged protein need to be continuously removed to recycle amino acids for new synthesis; in parallel, some key regulatory proteins fulfill their biological functions via selective degradation; furthermore, proteins are digested into peptides for MHC class I antigen presentation. To meet such complicated demands in biological process via spatial and temporal proteolysis, protein substrates have to be recognized, recruited, and eventually hydrolyzed in a well controlled fashion. Thus, 19S regulatory particle pertains a series of important capabilities to address these functional challenges. To recognize protein as designated substrate, 19S complex has subunits that are capable to recognize proteins with a special degradative tag, the ubiquitinylation. It also have subunits that can bind with nucleotides (e.g., ATPs) in order to facilitate the association between 19S and 20S particles, as well as to cause confirmation changes of alpha subunit C-terminals that form the substrate entrance of 20S complex. Rpn2 is the largest subunit of 19S regulatory particle and stays at the center of the "base" subcomplex of 19S particle.

== Clinical significance ==
The proteasome and its subunits are of clinical significance for at least two reasons: (1) a compromised complex assembly or a dysfunctional proteasome can be associated with the underlying pathophysiology of specific diseases, and (2) they can be exploited as drug targets for therapeutic interventions. More recently, more effort has been made to consider the proteasome for the development of novel diagnostic markers and strategies. An improved and comprehensive understanding of the pathophysiology of the proteasome should lead to clinical applications in the future.

The proteasomes form a pivotal component for the ubiquitin–proteasome system (UPS) and corresponding cellular Protein Quality Control (PQC). Protein ubiquitination and subsequent proteolysis and degradation by the proteasome are important mechanisms in the regulation of the cell cycle, cell growth and differentiation, gene transcription, signal transduction and apoptosis. Subsequently, a compromised proteasome complex assembly and function lead to reduced proteolytic activities and the accumulation of damaged or misfolded protein species. Such protein accumulation may contribute to the pathogenesis and phenotypic characteristics in neurodegenerative diseases, cardiovascular diseases, inflammatory responses and autoimmune diseases, and systemic DNA damage responses leading to malignancies.

Several experimental and clinical studies have indicated that aberrations and deregulations of the UPS contribute to the pathogenesis of several neurodegenerative and myodegenerative disorders, including Alzheimer's disease, Parkinson's disease and Pick's disease, Amyotrophic lateral sclerosis (ALS), Huntington's disease, Creutzfeldt–Jakob disease, and motor neuron diseases, polyglutamine (PolyQ) diseases, Muscular dystrophies and several rare forms of neurodegenerative diseases associated with dementia. As part of the Ubiquitin-Proteasome System (UPS), the proteasome maintains cardiac protein homeostasis and thus plays a significant role in cardiac ischemic injury, ventricular hypertrophy and heart failure. Additionally, evidence is accumulating that the UPS plays an essential role in malignant transformation. UPS proteolysis plays a major role in responses of cancer cells to stimulatory signals that are critical for the development of cancer. Accordingly, gene expression by degradation of transcription factors, such as p53, c-jun, c-Fos, NF-κB, c-Myc, HIF-1α, MATα2, STAT3, sterol-regulated element-binding proteins and androgen receptors are all controlled by the UPS and thus involved in the development of various malignancies. Moreover, the UPS regulates the degradation of tumor suppressor gene products such as adenomatous polyposis coli (APC) in colorectal cancer, retinoblastoma (Rb). and von Hippel–Lindau tumor suppressor (VHL), as well as a number of proto-oncogenes (Raf, Myc, Myb, Rel, Src, Mos, ABL). The UPS is also involved in the regulation of inflammatory responses. This activity is usually attributed to the role of proteasomes in the activation of NF-κB which further regulates the expression of pro inflammatory cytokines such as TNF-α, IL-β, IL-8, adhesion molecules (ICAM-1, VCAM-1, P-selectin) and prostaglandins and nitric oxide (NO) Additionally, the UPS also plays a role in inflammatory responses as regulators of leukocyte proliferation, mainly through proteolysis of cyclines and the degradation of CDK inhibitors. Lastly, autoimmune disease patients with SLE, Sjögren syndrome and rheumatoid arthritis (RA) predominantly exhibit circulating proteasomes which can be applied as clinical biomarkers.

A clinical study on patients with age-related macular degeneration identified four significant proteins, including 26S proteasome non-ATPase regulatory subunit 1 (Rpn2), that were increased, according to semi-quantitative proteomic profiling. The study reported that an LC-MRM assay revealed a significant increase of Rpn2 in 15 macula degeneration patients compared to the control subjects, suggesting that this protein could be a biomarker for this condition. Age-related macular degeneration is the leading cause of blindness in the world. Evidence is accumulating that the suppression of the UPS contributes to the increase of toxic proteins and inflammation in retina pigment epithelium, the functional abnormalities and/or the degeneration of which are believed to be the initiators and major pathologies of macula degeneration. There are only limited options for the treatment of macular degeneration, thus early identification of susceptibility and preventive measures are important therapeutic strategies. New potential biomarkers for neovascular macular degeneration and UPS-related proteins that are altered in patients such as Rpn2 may serve as the basis for future clinical studies to determine target proteins involved in the protection of the eye against macula degeneration.
