= List of databases for oncogenomic research =

Databases for oncogenomic research are biological databases dedicated to cancer data and oncogenomic research. They can be a primary source of cancer data, offer a certain level of analysis (processed data) or even offer online data mining.

== List ==
The table below gives an overview of databases for that serve specifically for oncogenomic research. Note that this is not a comprehensive list and does not contain databases that have a generic focus. You may find databases containing cancer data among the List of biological databases or Microarray databases.

Database	Institute / Organization	Alteration Types	Primary Source (Note: The database is the publication site for (some of) its cancer raw data)	Processed Data (Note: The database contains cancer data at a certain level of analysis (non-raw data))	Organisms	Cell lines (Note: The database also contains cell line data)	Public Data (Note: The database contains cancer data that is available for everyone)	Restricted Data (Note: The database contains cancer data that is only available under some restriction)
The BioExpress® Oncology Suite from Ocimum Bio Solutions contains gene expression data from primary, metastatic, and benign tumor samples, and normal samples, including matched adjacent controls. (BioExpress Oncology Suite) →	Ocimum Bio Solutions, United States	Gene Expression	Yes	Yes	Human, Rat and Mouse	Yes	No	Yes
ClinicalTrials.gov contains descriptions and some results from clinical trials, many of which are genomically targeted. →	National Institutes of Health, United States	Various	Yes	Yes	Human	No	Yes	No
Project Data Sphere from The CEO Life Sciences Consortium allows researchers to share, integrate, and analyze de-identified patient-level, comparator arm, phase III cancer data. →	The CEO Life Sciences Consortium, United States	Various	No	Yes	Human	No	Yes	Yes
Catalogue Of Somatic Mutations In Cancer (COSMIC) →	Wellcome Trust Sanger Institute, UK	Mutation	No	Yes	Human	Yes	Yes	Yes
cBio Cancer Genomics Portal →	Memorial Sloan-Kettering Cancer Center, United States	Copy number, Mutation, Methylation, Gene Expression, miRNA Expression, Protein, Phosphorylation	No	Yes	Human	No	Yes	No
International Cancer Genome Consortium →	Worldwide	Mutation	Yes	Yes	Human	No	Yes	Yes
Integrative Oncogenomics Cancer Browser (IntOGen) →	Universitat Pompeu Fabra, Spain	Copy number, Mutation, Gene Expression	No	Yes	Human	No	Yes	No
Mouse Retrovirus Tagged Cancer Gene Database →	Institute of Molecular and Cell Biology, Singapore	Mutations	Yes	Yes	Mouse	No	Yes	No
Mouse Tumor Biology Database → (Note: Only contains references to biological data)	The Jackson Laboratory, United States	Copy number, Mutation, Methylation, Gene Expression	No	No	Mouse	No	No	No
OncoDB.HCC →	Academia Sinica, Taiwan	Copy number, Gene Expression, QTL	No	Yes	Human, Mouse, Rat	No	Yes	No
Genevestigator → contains data from numerous public repositories including GEO and renowned cancer research projects as TCGA.	Nebion AG, Switzerland	Gene Expression	No	Yes	Human, Mouse, Rat, Monkey, Dog and others	Yes	Yes	Yes
OncoLand from Omicsoft Corporation contains data from large-scale Genomic projects, include TCGA, ICGC and others]	Omicsoft Corporation, United States	Copy number, Mutation, Methylation, Gene Expression, miRNA Expression, Protein, Phosphorylation	Yes	Yes	Human, Rat and Mouse	Yes	Yes	Yes
Oncomine →	Compendia Bioscience, Inc., United States	Gene Expression	No	Yes	Human	Yes	No	Yes
Oncoreveal →	Boğaziçi University, Turkey	Gene Expression	No	Yes	Human	No	Yes	No
Progenetix →	Universität Zürich, Switzerland	Copy number	No	Yes	Human	Yes	Yes	No
The Cancer Genome Atlas →	National Cancer Institute, United States	Copy number, Mutation, Methylation, Gene Expression, miRNA expression	Yes	Yes	Human	No	Yes	Yes
CancerResource →	University Medicine Berlin, Germany							
Roche Cancer Genome Database (RCGDB)	Roche Diagnostics, Penzberg, Germany							
Network of Cancer Genes →	King's College London, UK	Mutation	No	Yes	Human	No	Yes	No
MutaGene	NCBI, NIH, USA	Mutation	No	Yes	Human	No	Yes	No

== See also ==
- Cancer Research
- List of biological databases
- Microarray databases
- Oncogenomics
- Oncology
