= Phylogenetic inference using transcriptomic data =

In molecular phylogenetics, relationships among individuals are determined using character traits, such as DNA, RNA or protein, which may be obtained using a variety of sequencing technologies. High-throughput next-generation sequencing has become a popular technique in transcriptomics, which represent a snapshot of gene expression. In eukaryotes, making phylogenetic inferences using RNA is complicated by alternative splicing, which produces multiple transcripts from a single gene. As such, a variety of approaches may be used to improve phylogenetic inference using transcriptomic data obtained from RNA-Seq and processed using computational phylogenetics.

== Sequence acquisition ==
There have been several transcriptomics technologies used to gather sequence information on transcriptomes. However the most widely used is RNA-Seq.

=== RNA-Seq ===
RNA reads may be obtained using a variety of RNA-seq methods.

=== Public databases ===
There are a number of public databases that contain freely available RNA-Seq data.

== Assembly ==
=== Sequence assembly ===
RNA-Seq data may be directly assembled into transcripts using sequence assembly. Two main categories of sequence assembly are often distinguished:

1. de novo transcriptome assembly - especially important when a reference genome is not available for a given species.
2. Genome-guided assembly (sometimes mapping or reference-guided assembly) - is capable of using a pre-existing reference to guide the assembly of transcripts

Both methods attempt to generate biologically representative isoform-level constructs from RNA-seq data and generally attempt to associate isoforms with a gene-level construct. However, proper identification of gene-level constructs may be complicated by recent duplications, paralogs, alternative splicing or gene fusions. These complications may also cause downstream issues during ortholog inference. When selecting or generating sequence data, it is also vital to consider the tissue type, developmental stage and environmental conditions of the organisms. Since the transcriptome represents a snapshot of gene expression, minor changes to these conditions may significantly affect which transcripts are expressed. This may detrimentally affect downstream ortholog detection.

=== Public databases ===
RNA may also be acquired from public databases, such as GenBank, RefSeq, 1000 Plants (1KP) and 1KITE. Public databases potentially offer curated sequences which can improve inference quality and avoid the computational overhead associated with sequence assembly.

== Inferring gene pair orthology/paralogy ==
=== Approaches ===
Orthology or paralogy inference requires an assessment of sequence homology, usually via sequence alignment. Phylogenetic analyses and sequence alignment are often considered jointly, as phylogenetic analyses using DNA or RNA require sequence alignment and alignments themselves often represent some hypothesis of homology. As proper ortholog identification is pivotal to phylogenetic analyses, there are a variety of methods available to infer orthologs and paralogs.

These methods are generally distinguished as either graph-based algorithms or tree-based algorithms. Some examples of graph-based methods include InParanoid, MultiParanoid, OrthoMCL, HomoloGene and OMA. Tree-based algorithms include programs such as OrthologID or RIO.

A variety of BLAST methods are often used to detect orthologs between species as a part of graph-based algorithms, such as MegaBLAST, BLASTALL, or other forms of all-versus-all BLAST and may be nucleotide- or protein-based alignments. RevTrans will even use protein data to inform DNA alignments, which can be beneficial for resolving more distant phylogenetic relationships. These approaches often assume that best-reciprocal-hits passing some threshold metric(s), such as identity, E-value, or percent alignment, represent orthologs and may be confounded by incomplete lineage sorting.

=== Databases and tools ===
Orthology relationships in public databases typically represent gene-level orthology and do not provide information concerning conserved alternative splice variants.

Databases that contain and/or detect orthologous relationships include:

- DIOPT
- Ensembl Compara
- GreenPhylDB
- HaMStR
- HomoloGene
- InParanoid Archived 2021-05-03 at the Wayback Machine
- MultiParanoid
- OMA
- OrthoDB
- OrthoFinder
- OrthologID
- OrthoMCL
- OrtholugeDB
- PhylomeDB
- TreeFam
- eggNOG
- metaPhOrs

== Multiple sequence alignment ==
As eukaryotic transcription is a complex process by which multiple transcripts may be generated from a single gene through alternative splicing with variable expression, the utilization of RNA is more complicated than DNA. However, transcriptomes are cheaper to sequence than complete genomes and may be obtained without the use of a pre-existing reference genome.

It is not uncommon to translate RNA sequence into protein sequence when using transcriptomic data, especially when analyzing highly diverged taxa. This is an intuitive step as many (but not all) transcripts are expected to code for protein isoforms. Potential benefits include the reduction of mutational biases and a reduced number of characters, which may speed analyses. However, this reduction in characters may also result in the loss of potentially informative characters.

There are a number of tools available for multiple sequence alignment. All of which possess their own strengths and weaknesses and may be specialized for distinct sequence types (DNA, RNA or protein). As such, a splice-aware aligner may be ideal for aligning RNA sequences, whereas an aligner that considers protein structure or residue substitution rates may be preferable for translated RNA sequence data.

== Opportunities and limitations ==
The use of RNA for phylogenetic analysis presents both advantages and challenges.

=== Advantages ===
- large set of characters
- cost-effective
- not dependent upon a reference genome

=== Disadvantages ===
- expenses of extensive taxon sampling
- difficulty in identification of full-length, single-copy transcripts and orthologs
- potential misassembly of transcripts (especially when duplicates are present)
- missing data as a product of the transcriptome representing a snapshot of expression or incomplete lineage sorting

== See also ==
- BLAST
- Coding region
- Computational phylogenetics
- De novo transcriptome assembly
- Exome
- Exome sequencing
- Expressed sequence tag
- Gene expression
- Homology
- List of phylogenetics software
- Phylogenetics
- Phylogenetic tree
- RNA
- RNA-Seq
- Sequence alignment
- Synonymous substitution
- Systematics
- Transcriptome
- UniGene
