= C22orf42 =

Protein-coding gene

Identifiers
- Aliases: C22orf42, dJ90G24.6, chromosome 22 open reading frame 42
- External IDs: GeneCards: C22orf42

Gene location (Human)
Chr.	Chromosome 22 (human)
Band	22q12.3	Start	32,149,006 bp
Band	22q12.3	End	32,159,322 bp
RNA expression pattern
Bgee	Human / Mouse (ortholog); Top expressed in: sperm; islet of Langerhans; testicle; buccal mucosa cell; right testis; left testis; hypothalamus; gonad; pituitary gland; anterior pituitary / n/a; More reference expression data
BioGPS	n/a
Orthologs
Databases	NCBI: entry; OMA: entry
Species	Human	Mouse
Entrez	150297	n/a
Ensembl	ENSG00000205856	n/a
UniProt	Q6IC83	n/a
RefSeq (mRNA)	NM_001010859	n/a
RefSeq (protein)	NP_001010859	n/a
Location (UCSC)	Chr 22: 32.15 – 32.16 Mb	n/a
PubMed search		n/a
- Wikidata
View/Edit Human

C22orf42, short for Chromosome 22 Open Reading Frame 42, is a protein-coding gene located on the long arm of chromosome 22 at position q12 C22orf42 weighs 27.679 kilodaltons and is thought to be widely expressed in biological contexts, including pituitary adenoma, impaired spermatogenesis, and stress response. While the main molecular function remains to be discovered, recent studies have suggested C22orf42 may be subject to regulation via methylation and RNA modification mechanisms, which could influence its expression in specific developmental or disease contexts.

== Gene ==
The mRNA transcript for C22orf42 consists of a sequence of 1,378 base nucleotides. It contains 9 exons, and the full transcript includes: a nuclear localization signal at the beginning and end of this sequence, multiple predicted phosphorylation sites, multiple internal repeats, a polyA signal sequence located between the 1358 and 1363 base pairs, and a polyA site on the last base pair of transcription.

== Protein ==
=== Primary Sequence ===
The C22orf42 gene encodes a protein consisting of 251 amino acids.. The protein is predicted to localize to the cytoplasm and may be involved in intracellular signaling or structural regulation within the testis and the brain. However, these functions remain hypothetical due to limited experimental validation.

=== Sub-Cellular localization ===
DeepLoc approximately predicted a 59% localization to the cytoplasm and approximately 40% to the nucleus, 35% to the cell membrane, and 28% to the mitochondria. Since cytoplasm was the highest prediction, C22orf42 is predicted to be localized in the cytoplasm.

=== Post-Translational Modifications ===
Predicted phosphorylation sites in the human C22orf42 protein using NetPhos 3.1. Peaks above the magenta threshold line (0.5) indicate high-confidence phosphorylation sites, with serine (red), threonine (green), and tyrosine (blue) residues mapped across the sequence. A notable cluster of predicted serine phosphorylation sites is observed between residues 175 and 225.

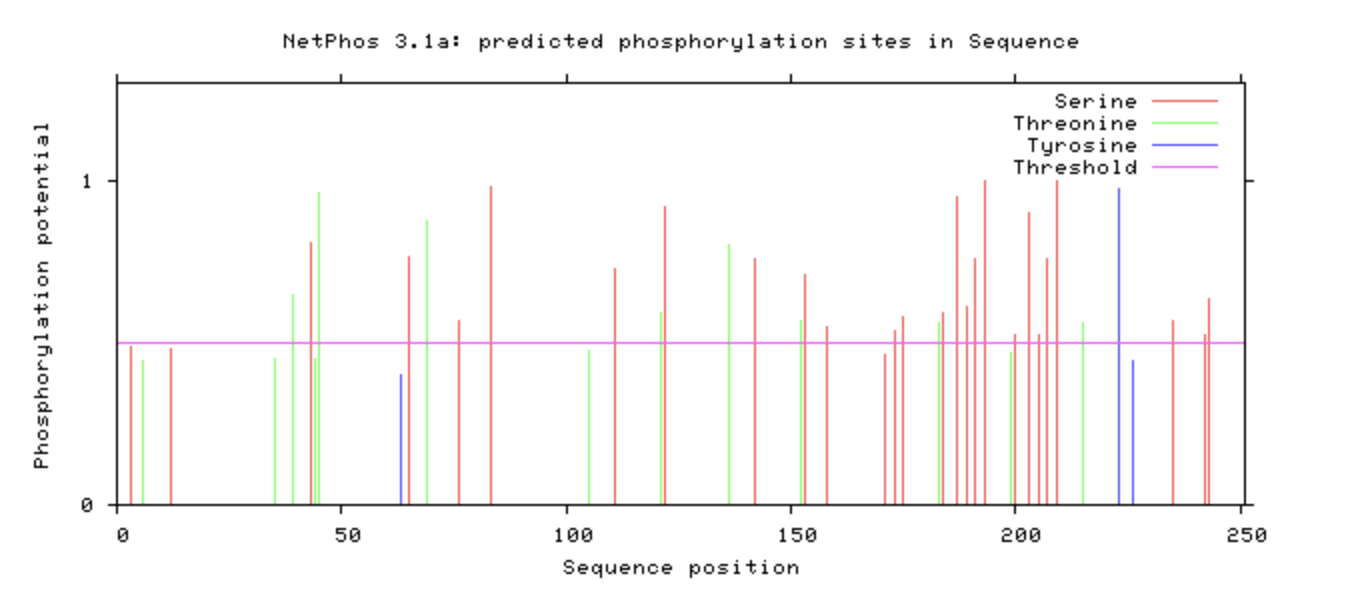
NetPhos 3.1a predicted multiple high-confidence phosphorylation sites across the C22orf42 protein sequence, with serine residues being the most frequently modified.

=== Ortholog Sequences ===
C22orf42 is conserved across primates only and has only one known paralog, DRICH1. Orthologous sequences of C22orf42 were analyzed by sorting them according to their median date of divergence and categorizing them by genus name, common name, taxonomic group, accession number, sequence length (in amino acids), sequence identity to the human protein, and sequence similarity to the human protein. As C22orf42 is a gene exclusive to primates, no orthologs were identified outside this taxonomic group. The Crab-eating macaque (Macaca fascicularis) represents the most distantly related species with a median divergence time of 28.8 million years and a sequence identity of 25.1%. Sequence identities and similarities were determined using the EMBOSS NEEDLE pairwise alignment tool.

Orthologs of C22orf42
Genus and Species	Common Name	Taxonomic Group (Order)	Date of Divergence (MYA)	Accession #	Sequence Length (aa)	Sequence Identity (%)
Homo sapiens	Human	Primate	0	NP_001010859.1	251	100
Pan Troglodytes	Chimpanzee	Apes	6.4	NP_001266945.1	207	81.51
Pan piniscus	Bonobo	Apes	6.4	XP_054961926.2	221	81.09
Pongo abelii	Sumatran Orangutan	Apes	15.2	XP_054399340.2	192	76.81
Pongo pygmaeus	Bornean Orangutan	Apes	15.2	XP_054326077.1	192	76.81
Macaca nemestrina	Southern Pig-tailed Macaque	Old World Monkey	28.8	XP_070936571.1	349	35.3
Macaca mulatta	Indochinese Rhesus Macaque	Old World Monkey	28.8	XP_028683601.1	405	29.6
Rhinopithecus roxellana	Golden Snub-Nosed Monkey	Old World Monkey	28.8	XP_030771153.1	376	26
Chlorocebus Sabaeus	Green Monkey	Old World Monkey	28.8	XP_072863228.1	232	24.9
Condylura cristata	Star-nosed Mole	Eulipotyphla	28.8	XP_004676507	167	25.1

== Expression ==
=== Gene Expression ===
C22orf42 displays a tissue-specific expression profile, with the highest RNA levels detected in the testis ~3.2 RPKM, according to RNA-seq data from the Human Protein Atlas (HPA) across 27 human tissues. Sequencing was performed on samples from 95 individuals, and expression values are reported in RPKM (reads per kilobase of transcript per million). Moderate expression was observed in the Stomach, Prostate, and Salivary gland, while most other tissues exhibited minimal or undetectable levels, indicating restricted expression primarily in male reproductive tissues.

Additional insights from the NCBI Gene Expression Omnibus (GEO) dataset GDS2697 reinforce this expression pattern. C22orf42 expression is reduced in patients with Teratozoospermia compared to individuals with normal sperm. In the normal group, expression counts are consistently higher, and percentile ranks remain near the upper quartile. In contrast, the teratozoospermic group exhibits lower expression levels, with several samples falling below the 25th percentile and one showing a complete absence of detectable signal. These findings suggest that C22orf42 may play a role in maintaining normal sperm structure or development and could be disrupted in male infertility disorders.

=== Protein Expression ===
Immunochemistry analysis using Thermo Scientific shows C22orf42 protein localization split into two images. The left image displays strong antibody staining in the testis, indicating high protein expression, while the right image shows weak staining in the kidney, reflecting low protein abundance. Antibody binding appears to be primarily cytoplasmic, supporting tissue-specific protein expression.

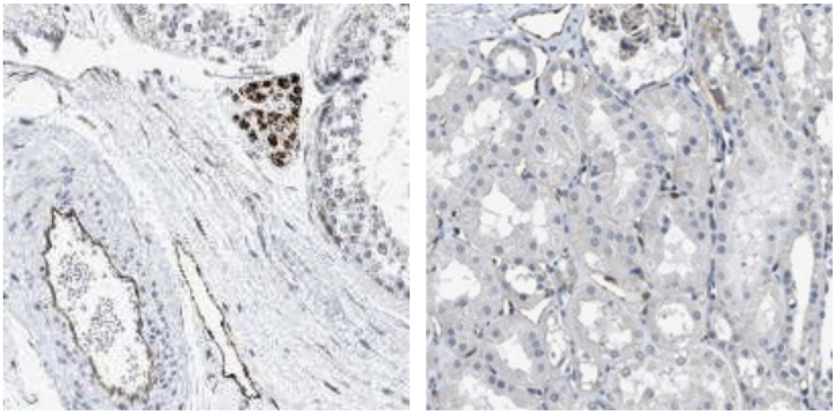
Immunohistochemistry reveals cytoplasmic C22orf42 localization with high expression in testis (left) and low expression in kidney (right).
