= Microarray databases =

A microarray database is a repository containing microarray gene expression data. The key uses of a microarray database are to store the measurement data, manage a searchable index, and make the data available to other applications for analysis and interpretation (either directly, or via user downloads).

Microarray databases can fall into two distinct classes:

1. A peer reviewed, public repository that adheres to academic or industry standards and is designed to be used by many analysis applications and groups. A good example of this is the Gene Expression Omnibus (GEO) from NCBI or ArrayExpress from EBI.
2. A specialized repository associated primarily with the brand of a particular entity (lab, company, university, consortium, group), an application suite, a topic, or an analysis method, whether it is commercial, non-profit, or academic. These databases might have one or more of the following characteristics:
  - A subscription or license may be needed to gain full access,
  - The content may come primarily from a specific group (e.g. SMD, or UPSC-BASE), the Immunological Genome Project
  - There may be constraints on who can use the data or for what purpose data can be used,
  - Special permission may be required to submit new data, or there may be no obvious process at all,
  - Only certain applications may be equipped to use the data, often also associated with the same entity (for example, caArray at NCI is specialized for the caBIG),
  - Further processing or reformatting of the data may be required for standard applications or analysis,
  - They claim to address the 'urgent need' to have a standard, centralized repository for microarray data. (See YMD, last updated in 2003, for example),
  - There is a claim to an incremental improvement over one of the public repositories,
  - A meta-analysis application, which incorporates studies from one or more public databases (e.g. Gemma primarily uses GEO studies; NextBio uses various sources)

Some of the most known public, curated microarray databases are:

Database	Scope	Microarray experiment sets	Sample profiles	As of date
ArrayTrack	ArrayTrack hosts both public and private data, including MAQC benchmark data, with integrated analysis tools	1622	50,093	Feb 2012
NCI mAdb	Hosts NCI data with integrated analysis and statistics tools	?	105,000	Mar 2012
ImmGen database	Open access across all immune system cells; expression data, differential expression, coregulated clusters, regulation	267	1059	Jan 2012
Genevestigator	Gene expression search engine based on manually curated, well annotated public and proprietary microarray and RNA-seq datasets	3228	232,855	October 2016
Gene Expression Omnibus - NCBI	any curated MIAME compliant molecular abundance study	25859	641770	October 28, 2011
ArrayExpress at EBI	Any curated MIAME or MINSEQE compliant transcriptomics data	24838	708914	October 28, 2011
Stanford Microarray database	private and published microarray and molecule abundance database (now defunct)	82542	?	October 23, 2011
The Cancer Genome Atlas (TCGA)	collection of expression data for different cancers	21229	?	August 30, 2013
GeneNetwork system	Open access standard arrays, exons arrays, and RNA-seq data for genetic analysis (eQTL studies) with analysis suite	~100	~10000	July, 2010
UNC modENCODE Microarray database	Nimblegen customer 2.1 million array	~6	180	July 17, 2009
UPSC-BASE	data generated by microarray analysis within Umeå Plant Science Centre (UPSC).	~100	?	November 15, 2007
UPenn RAD database	MIAME compliant public and private studies, associated with ArrayExpress	~100	~2500	Sept. 1, 2007
UNC Microarray database	provides the service for microarray data storage, retrieval, analysis, and visualization	~31	2093	April 1, 2007
MUSC database	The database is a repository for DNA microarray data generated by MUSC investigators as well as researchers in the global research community.	~45	555	April 1, 2007
caArray at NCI	Cancer data, prepared for analysis on caBIG	41	1741	November 15, 2006

== See also ==
- Biological database
- List of biological databases
- DNA microarray
  - DNA microarray § Data warehousing
- Microarray analysis techniques
