= TMEM125 =

Protein-coding gene found in humans

Identifiers
- Aliases: TMEM125, transmembrane protein 125
- External IDs: MGI: 1923409; GeneCards: TMEM125

Gene location (Human)
| Chr. | Chromosome 1 (human) |
| Band | 1p34.2 | Start | 43,269,983 bp |
| Band | 1p34.2 | End | 43,274,002 bp |

Gene location (Mouse)
| Chr. | Chromosome 4 (mouse) |
| Band | 4|4 D2.1 | Start | 118,398,138 bp |
| Band | 4|4 D2.1 | End | 118,401,241 bp |
RNA expression pattern
| Bgee | Human / Mouse (ortholog); Top expressed in: mucosa of ileum; body of pancreas; pancreatic ductal cell; right lung; upper lobe of left lung; right lobe of thyroid gland; left lobe of thyroid gland; mucosa of transverse colon; C1 segment; lower lobe of lung / Top expressed in: lumbar subsegment of spinal cord; yolk sac; esophagus; deep cerebellar nuclei; lacrimal gland; right kidney; proximal tubule; anterior horn of spinal cord; vestibular membrane of cochlear duct; parotid gland; More reference expression data |
| BioGPS | n/a |
Gene ontology
| Molecular function | molecular function |
| Cellular component | membrane; integral component of membrane; cellular component |
| Biological process | biological process |
Sources:Amigo / QuickGO
Orthologs
| Databases | NCBI: entry; OMA: entry |
| Species | Human | Mouse |
| Entrez | 128218 | 230678 |
| Ensembl | ENSG00000179178 | ENSMUSG00000050854 |
| UniProt | Q96AQ2 | Q8CHQ6 |
| RefSeq (mRNA) | NM_144626; NM_001320244 | NM_172383 |
| RefSeq (protein) | NP_001307173; NP_653227 | NP_759015 |
| Location (UCSC) | Chr 1: 43.27 – 43.27 Mb | Chr 4: 118.4 – 118.4 Mb |
| PubMed search |
- Wikidata
| View/Edit Human | View/Edit Mouse |

Transmembrane protein 125 is a protein that, in humans, is encoded by the TMEM125 gene. It has 4 transmembrane domains and is expressed in the lungs, thyroid, pancreas, intestines, spinal cord, and brain. Though its function is currently poorly understood by the scientific community, research indicates it may be involved in colorectal and lung cancer networks. Additionally, it was identified as a cell adhesion molecule in oligodendrocytes, suggesting it may play a role in neuron myelination.

== Gene ==
The TMEM125 gene has no aliases, except for its encoded protein’s name. Its cytogenic location is at 1p34.2 on the plus strand and it spans from bases 43,272,723 to 43,273,379. TMEM125 comprises four exons.

=== Gene-level regulation ===
Five TMEM125 promoters were identified by Genomatix Gene2Promoter. The primary promoter (NM_001320244) is 1881 bp in length. It consists of binding sites for fork head domain factors and zinc finger transcription factors.

== Transcript ==
TMEM125 has two variant transcripts that differ only in the 5' untranslated region (UTR), but both encode the same protein. mRNA variant 1 represents the longer of the two variants and is 1898 base pairs (bp) in length; variant 2 is 1797 bp long.

=== Transcript-level regulation ===
TMEM125 microarray-assessed expression patterns in normal human tissue demonstrate the primary tissues of expression are the pancreas, lungs, salivary glands, trachea, brain, prostate, spinal cord, and thyroid. Additionally, RNA-seq data illustrates transcript expression in the following additional tissue: colon, small intestines, prostate, and stomach.

== Protein ==
=== Predicted structure ===
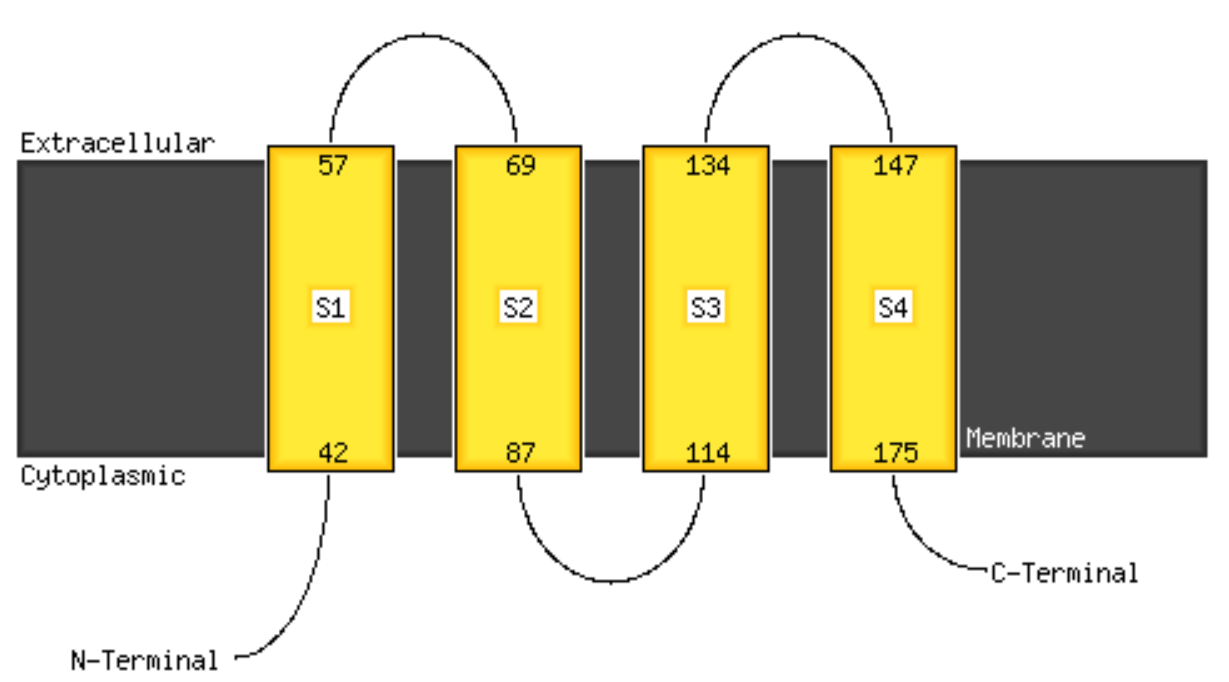
TMEM125 predicted topology, generated by Phyre2

TMEM125 comprises 219 amino acids with four transmembrane domains. Its predicted isoelectric point is 8.32 and predicted molecular weight is 22.1 kDa. It is primarily leucine-rich, and secondarily alanine- and glycine-rich; TMEM125 is also arginine- and lysine-deficient. It has two core repeat blocks, VALL and TTSS, which both appear twice within the protein.

The secondary structure of TMEM125 is predicted to consist of α-helices and small segments of β-sheets.

The tertiary structure and topology of TMEM125 was predicted and visualized through Phyre2.

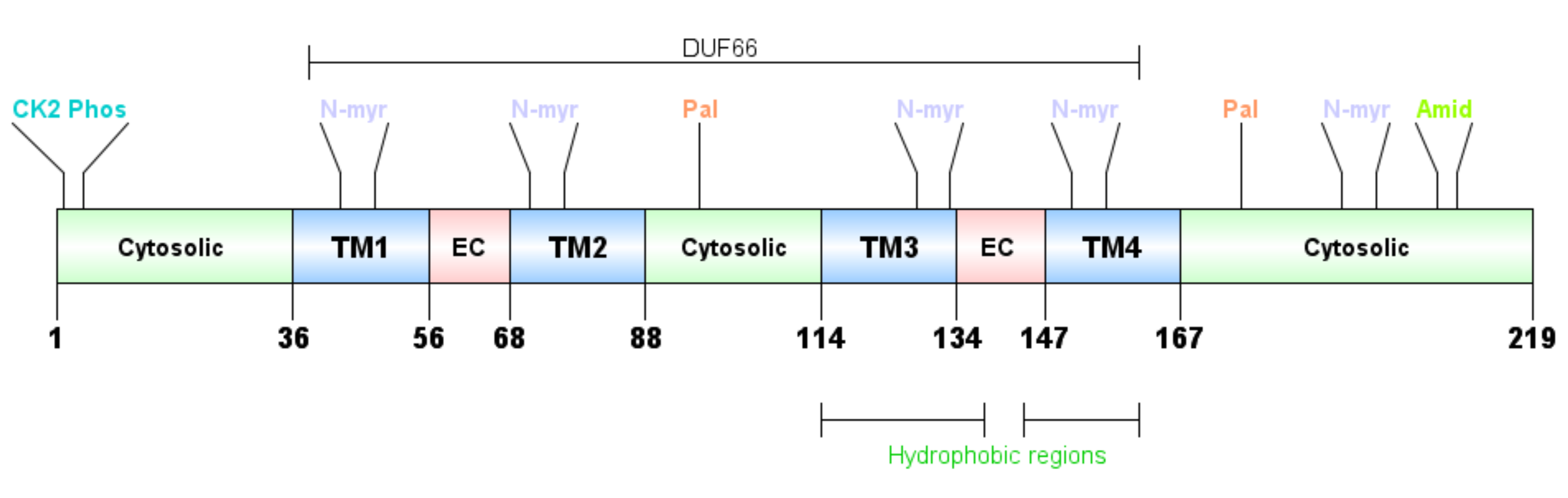
TMEM125 domains and predicted sites of post-translational modifications (PTMs)

=== Post-translational modifications and localization ===
TMEM125 has 1 predicted phosphorylation site (CK2 Phos), 5 predicted N-myristoylation sites (N-myr), 2 predicted palmitoylation sites (Pal), and 1 predicted amidation site (Amid). It also contains the domain of unknown function 66 (DUF66).

TMEM125 is predicted to be subcellularly localized in the plasma membrane. It is secondarily predicted to be localized in the endoplasmic reticulum.

=== Protein interactions ===
There were no scientifically-verified protein interactions identified for TMEM125. String Protein Interaction predicted 10 functional protein partners for TMEM125, but all were determined through textmining.

== Homology/evolution ==
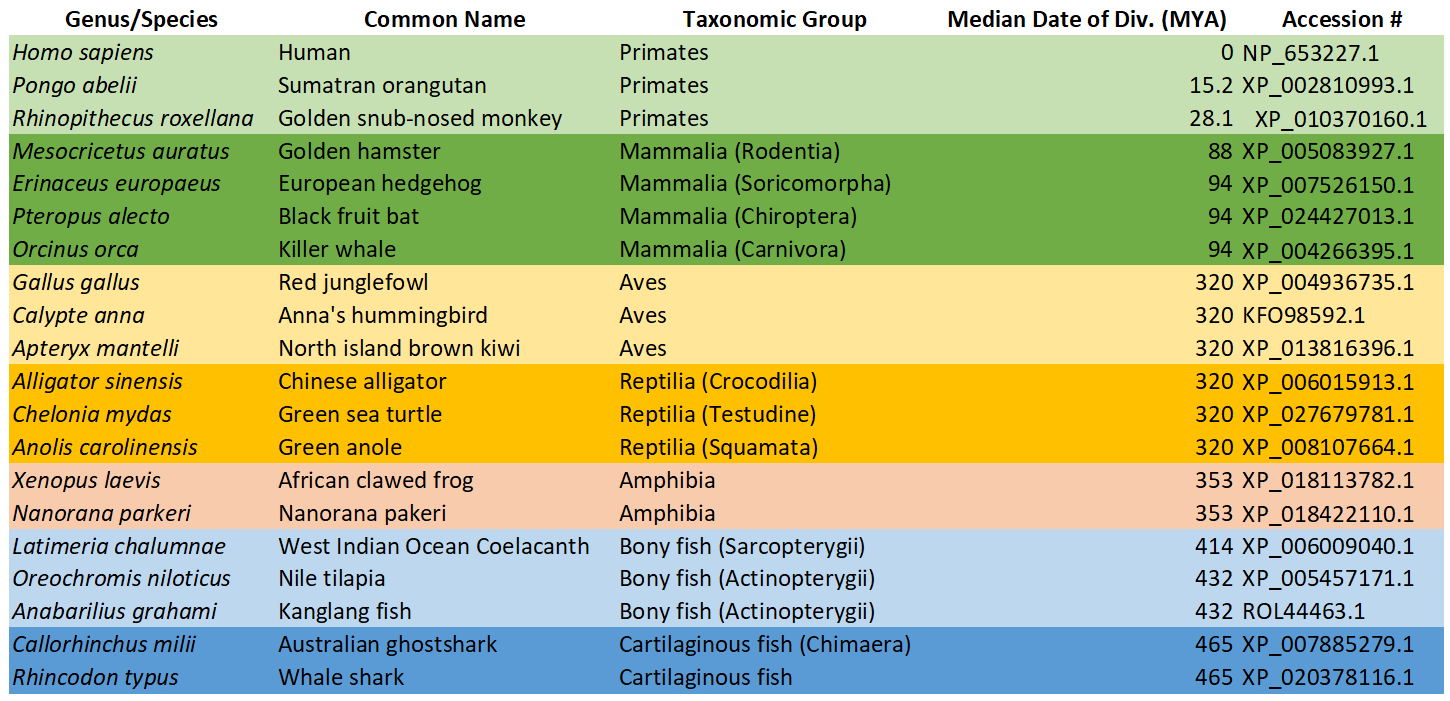
List of TMEM125 orthologs

TMEM125 is conserved in species as distantly related to humans as cartilaginous fish, that’s most recent common ancestor to humans existed 465 million years ago. TMEM125 is highly conserved in primates, mammals, birds, reptiles, bony fish, and cartilaginous fish, but is not observed in invertebrates.

TMEM125 does not have any paralogs.

== Clinical significance ==
In a topological transcriptome analysis, researchers profiled important proteins of the non-small cell lung cancer regulatory network and determined that TMEM125 exhibited different topological characteristics across cancerous and normal conditions, suggesting its criticality in lung cancer networks.

This is consistent with post-translational modification analysis; TMEM125 phosphorylation suggests it may be involved in a signal transduction pathway or as a receptor protein. Additionally, its myristoylation sites suggests its involvement in signal transduction, apoptosis, and alternative extracellular protein export.

TMEM125 was identified as a tetraspanin cell adhesion molecule enriched in oligodendrocytes, suggesting it may play a role in myelination. Additionally, its expression was not observed in differentiating oligodendrocytes in vitro, but was detected in oligodendrocytes from treated rat brains, which suggests its expression is regulated by the presence of axons.
