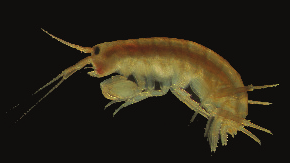
- Adult male
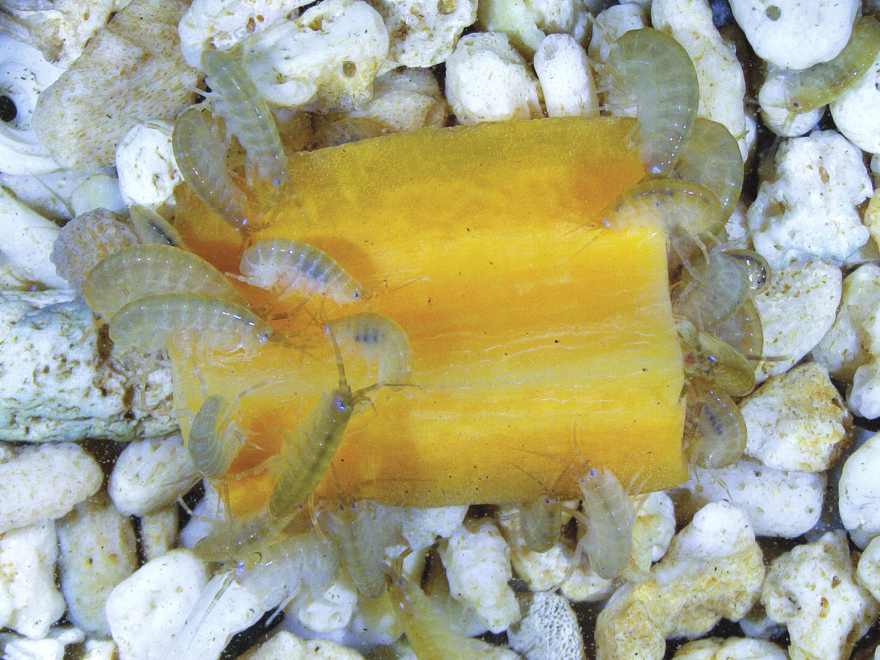
- Feeding on a slice of carrot

Scientific classification
- Kingdom: Animalia
- Phylum: Arthropoda
- Class: Malacostraca
- Order: Amphipoda
- Family: Hyalidae
- Genus: Parhyale
- Species: P. hawaiensis

Binomial name
- Parhyale hawaiensis Dana, 1853

= Parhyale hawaiensis =

Species of crustacean

Parhyale hawaiensis is an amphipod crustacean species that is used in developmental and genetic analyses. It is categorized as an emerging model organism as the main biological techniques necessary for the study of an organism have been established.

== Habitat ==
Parhyale hawaiensis is a detritovore that has a circumtropical, worldwide, intertidal, and shallow-water marine distribution, and it may occur as a species complex. It has been reported to occur in large populations (more than 3,000 per square metre) on decaying mangrove leaf material in environments subjected to rapid changes in salinity. The ability to tolerate rapid temperature and osmotic changes allows this species to thrive under typical laboratory conditions. It is a robust species and is being considered for aquaculture.

== Life cycle ==
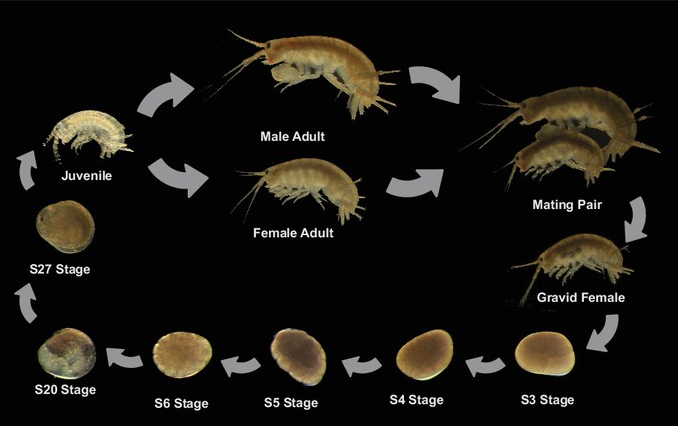
Life cycle of P. hawaiensis that takes about two months at 26 °C.

Females produce embryos every 2 weeks once they reach sexual maturity. Embryogenesis is relatively short, lasting about 10 days at 26 °C (79 °F). Females normally brood the embryos in a ventral brood pouch. Close examination of the embryonic development of P. hawaiensis has produced the most detailed staging system for any crustacean. Complete embryogenesis has been divided into 30 discrete stages, which are readily identifiable in living animals or by means of common molecular markers in fixed specimens. Hatchlings possess a complete complement of segments and appendages which are morphologically similar to those of adult animals.

== Genetic research ==
Parhyale hawaiensis is used in genetic research because eggs and embryos are easily manipulated. Embryos can be rapidly and easily removed from the brood pouch and maintained in seawater. Eggs can be collected and hatched individually, and the mature animals can subsequently be used in pairwise sister-brother or mother-son matings to generate inbred lines.

Fertilized eggs are sufficiently large to perform microinjections and blastomere isolations with relative ease. Developing P. hawaiensis embryos are clear, allowing for both detailed microscopic analyses in situ and the use of fluorescently tagged tracer molecules in live embryos. Early cleavage is holoblastic (total), allowing the fates of individual early cells to be explored through experimental manipulation.

A transcriptome of P. hawaiensis was initially generated using the pyrosequencing technique. This resource is freely available for download. Subsequent, more complete transcriptomes were generated using Illumina sequencing. The transcriptome data can be used for the creation of in situ probes and other experimental tools. The genome is available from NCBI

The genome of P. hawaiensis is available and was sequenced using Illumina short read sequencing. This first version (V3.0) of the genome was recently superseded by a more contiguous version generated by Chicago sequencing through the Dovetail platform. The new version Phaw_5.0 is available on NCBI.
