= ArrayTrack =

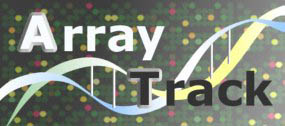
- Developer(s): U.S. Food and Drug Administration
- Stable release: 3.5.0 / March 3, 2010; 15 years ago
- Operating system: Linux, Mac OS X, Windows
- Platform: Java
- Type: Bioinformatics data management, analysis, and interpretation

ArrayTrack is a multi-purpose bioinformatics tool primarily used for microarray data management, analysis, and interpretation. ArrayTrack was developed to support in-house filter array research for the U.S. Food and Drug Administration in 2001, and was made freely available to the public as an integrated research tool for microarrays in 2003. Since then, ArrayTrack has averaged about 5,000 users per year. It is regularly updated by the National Center for Toxicological Research.

== Features ==
ArrayTrack is composed of three major components: Study Database, Tools, and Libraries, which primarily handle data management, analysis, and interpretation, respectively. Each of these components can be directly accessed from the other two, e.g., analysis Tools can be used directly on experimental data stored in the Study Database, and significant genes discovered from the results can be queried in the Libraries to view additional annotations and associated proteins, pathways, Gene Ontology terms, etc.

- Study Database: The Study Database contains user-imported experiment data, including both raw data and annotation data. It is mainly used to manage microarray data, but also supports proteomics and metabolomics data. Imported data are initially private to the owner but can be made available to other users. The Study Database also stores significant gene lists, which can be created directly from data analysis results in ArrayTrack.
- Tools: A wide variety of analysis and visualization Tools are available in ArrayTrack, including but are not limited to: statistical analysis Tools including T-Test, ANOVA, and SAM-Test; unsupervised pattern discovery Tools including Hierarchical Clustering Analysis and Principal Component Analysis; and model prediction Tools including K-Nearest Neighbors and Linear Discriminant Analysis. Although ArrayTrack's Tools are designed to accommodate imported data, they are also compatible with external data.
- Libraries: ArrayTrack hosts a collection of Libraries which store specific annotation data, viewable in a dynamic spreadsheet format. There is a Library specific for genes, proteins, pathways, Gene Ontology terms, chemical compounds, SNPs, QTL, chip types, and more. Each Library supports multi-input searching, sorting, filtering, copy-pasting, and exporting. Libraries can be directly queried for the desired contents of stored gene lists, analysis results, and other Libraries. A specific entry in any Library can be linked to the equivalent entry in many popular public knowledge bases, including the original sources of data.

ArrayTrack is directly integrated with a variety of other bioinformatics software, such as pathway analysis tools GeneGo MetaCore and Ingenuity Pathway Analysis.

== Accessibility ==
ArrayTrack is freely available to the public and can be accessed online. It is run on the client's computer using a Java-based interface that connects to an Oracle database hosted by the FDA. As a Java-based application, ArrayTrack is compatible with Windows, Mac, and Linux machines.
