= Transpogene =

TranspoGene and microTranspoGene

Content
- Description: transposed elements influence on the transcriptome

Contact
- Authors: Asaf Levy
- Primary citation: Levy & al. (2008)
- Release date: 2007

Access
- Website: http://transpogene.tau.ac.il/
- Download URL: download

TranspoGene in computational biology is a database of transposed elements located inside protein-coding genes of seven species.

== See also ==
- Transposon
