= Reference genes =

Reference genes are expressed in all cells of an organism under normal and patho-physiological conditions. Although some housekeeping genes (such as LDHA, NONO, PGK1 and PPIH,) are expressed at relatively constant levels in most non-pathological situations, other housekeeping genes may vary depending on experimental conditions. Although the terms "housekeeping gene" and "reference gene" are used somewhat interchangeably, caution must be used in selecting genes for reference purposes. Suitable reference genes must be stably expressed in the specific experimental condition or tissue of interest. Recently a web-based database of human and mouse cell specific reference genes/transcripts, named Housekeeping and Reference Transcript Atlas (HRT Atlas), was developed to offer reliable reference genes/transcripts for RT-qPCR data normalization.

This is a list of housekeeping genes and transcripts stably expressed across 52 human tissues and cell types that may be used for reference purposes after empirical validation:

Gene	Ensembl Transcript no.	Description	Chromosome
AES	ENST00000309311	Amino-terminal enhancer of split	chr19
AP2M1	ENST00000292807	Adaptor related protein complex 2 subunit mu 1	chr3
BSG	ENST00000353555	Basigin (Ok blood group)	chr19
CD59	ENST00000395850	CD59 molecule	chr11
CSNK2B	ENST00000375882	Casein kinase 2 beta	chr6
EDF1	ENST00000224073	Endothelial differentiation related factor 1	chr9
EEF2	ENST00000309311	Eukaryotic translation elongation factor 2	chr19
GABARAP	ENST00000577035	GABA type A receptor-associated protein	chr17
PFDN5	ENST00000334478	Prefoldin subunit 5	chr12
RHOA	ENST00000418115	Ras homolog family member A	chr3
ubiquitin C	ENST00000546120	Ubiquitin C	chr12

HRT Atlas allows searching of a complete list of reliable candidate reference genes and transcripts for RT-qPCR normalization in more than 120 human and mouse tissues or cell types. The database also offers some empirically validated primers and predicted modifiers (disease and small molecules) of the expression of these reference genes.

The following represent genes that should probably not be used for reference purposes: GUSB, RPLP0, TFRC, GAPDH, HSP90, and β-actin. Although they were once considered as "housekeeping genes," recent data suggests that they are not as reliable as once thought.

== See also ==
- Gene
- Genevestigator
- Genome
- Inducible gene
- Minimal genome
- Essential proteins in protein complexes
- Spatiotemporal gene expression
