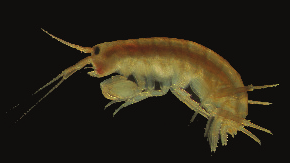
- Parhyale hawaiensis

Scientific classification
- Domain: Eukaryota
- Kingdom: Animalia
- Phylum: Arthropoda
- Class: Malacostraca
- Order: Amphipoda
- Family: Hyalidae
- Subfamily: Hyalinae
- Genus: Parhyale; Stebbing, 1897

Type species
- Parhyale fascigera Stebbing, 1897

= Parhyale =

Genus of crustaceans

Parhyale is a genus of amphipod crustaceans, containing the following species:

- Parhyale aquilina (Costa, 1853)
- Parhyale basrensis Salman, 1986
- Parhyale eburnea Krapp-Schickel, 1974
- Parhyale explorator Arresti, 1989
- Parhyale fascigera Stebbing, 1897
- Parhyale hachijoensis Hiwatari, 2002
- Parhyale hawaiensis (Dana, 1853)
- Parhyale inyacka K. H. Barnard, 1916
- Parhyale iwasai (Shoemaker, 1956)
- Parhyale multispinosa Stock, 1987
- Parhyale penicillata Shoemaker, 1956
- Parhyale philippinensis Hiwatari, 2002
- Parhyale plumicornis (Heller, 1866)
- Parhyale ptilocerus (Derzhavin, 1937)
