= CancerResource =

CancerResource:

Content
- Description: Cancer-related proteins and compounds

Contact
- Research center: University Medicine Berlin
- Laboratory: Institute for Physiology, Structural Bioinformatics Group
- Primary citation: PMID 20952398
- Release date: 2010

Access
- Website: http://bioinf-data.charite.de/cancerresource/

CancerResource is database of drug-target relationships related to cancer.

== See also ==
- COSMIC cancer database
- Databases for oncogenomic research
