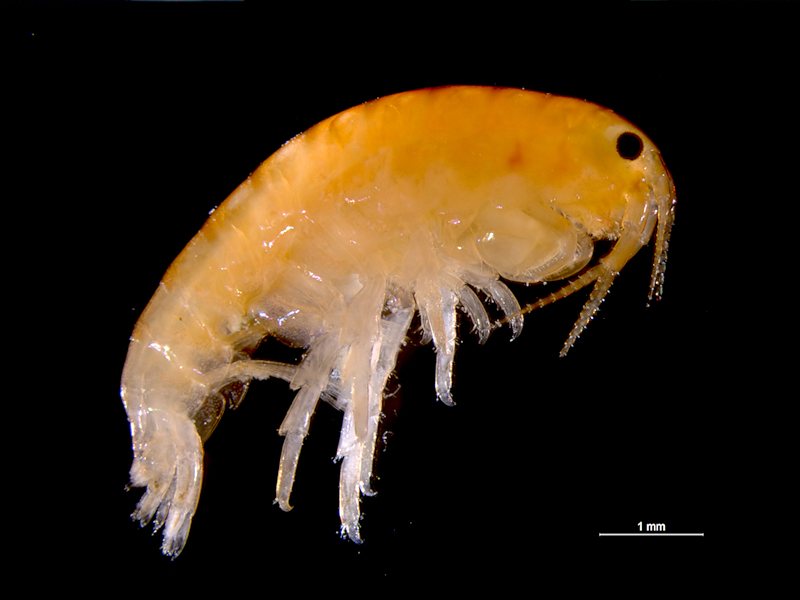
- Apohyale prevostii male

Scientific classification
- Domain: Eukaryota
- Kingdom: Animalia
- Phylum: Arthropoda
- Class: Malacostraca
- Order: Amphipoda
- Family: Hyalidae
- Subfamily: Hyalinae
- Genus: Apohyale; Bousfield & Hendrycks (2002)

Type species
- Apohyale pugettensis Dana (1853)

= Apohyale =

Genus of crustaceans

Apohyale is a genus of amphipods in the family Hyalidae, first described by E.L. Bousfield and E.A. Hendrycks in 2002, The type species by original designation is Allorchestes pugettensis Dana, 1853, currently (2023) accepted as Apohyale pugettensis (Dana, 1853).

== Distribution ==
Widespread in polar and temperate rocky coasts of the north and south Pacific. Habitat is intertidal and includes brackish and hypersaline ponds. Some species that live high in the intertidal zone are highly tolerant of a wide temperature and salinity range.

== Species ==
The species recognised as of October 2023 are:

- Apohyale anceps (J.L. Barnard, 1969)
- Apohyale ayeli (J.L. Barnard, 1955)
- Apohyale bassargini (Derzhavin, 1937)
- Apohyale bishopae (J.L. Barnard, 1955)
- Apohyale californica (J.L. Barnard, 1969)
- Apohyale crassipes (Heller, 1866)
- Apohyale diastoma (K.H. Barnard, 1916)
- Apohyale freemanae Kilgallen, 2011
- Apohyale furcata (Reid, 1951)
- Apohyale grandicornis (Krøyer, 1845)
- Apohyale gulbenkiani (Mateus & Mateus, 1962)
- Apohyale hirtipalma (Dana, 1852)
- Apohyale humboldti (J.L. Barnard, 1979)
- Apohyale media (Dana, 1853)
- Apohyale minor (Chevreux & Fage, 1925)
- Apohyale novaezealandiae (Thomson, 1879)
- Apohyale papanuiensis Kilgallen, 2011
- Apohyale perieri (Lucas, 1846)
- Apohyale prevostii (H. Milne Edwards, 1830)
- Apohyale pugettensis (Dana, 1853)
- Apohyale punctata (Hiwatari & Kajihara, 1981)
- Apohyale stebbingi (Chevreux, 1888)
- Apohyale uragensis (Hiwatari & Kajihara, 1981)
- Apohyale wakabarae (Serejo, 1999)

== Etymology ==
From the Greek apo (advanced) and Hyale, the root name for the family.
