= Full-parasites =

Content
- Description: full-length cDNAs of apicomplexa parasites

Contact
- Research center: Sam Ratulangi University
- Laboratory: Faculty of Medicine
- Authors: Josef Tuda
- Primary citation: Tuda & al. (2011)
- Release date: 2010

Access
- Website: http://fullmal.hgc.jp/

Full-Parasites is a transcriptome database of apicomplexa parasites.

== See also ==
- apicomplexa
