= Human-transcriptome DataBase for Alternative Splicing =

H-DBAS

Content
- Description: alternative splicing database of completely sequenced and manually annotated full-length cDNAs

Contact
- Authors: Jun-ichi Takeda
- Primary citation: Takeda & al. (2007)
- Release date: 2006

Access
- Website: www.h-invitational.jp/h-dbas/

The Human-transcriptome DataBase for Alternative Splicing (H-DBAS) is a database of alternatively spliced human transcripts based on H-Invitational.

== See also ==
- Alternative splicing
