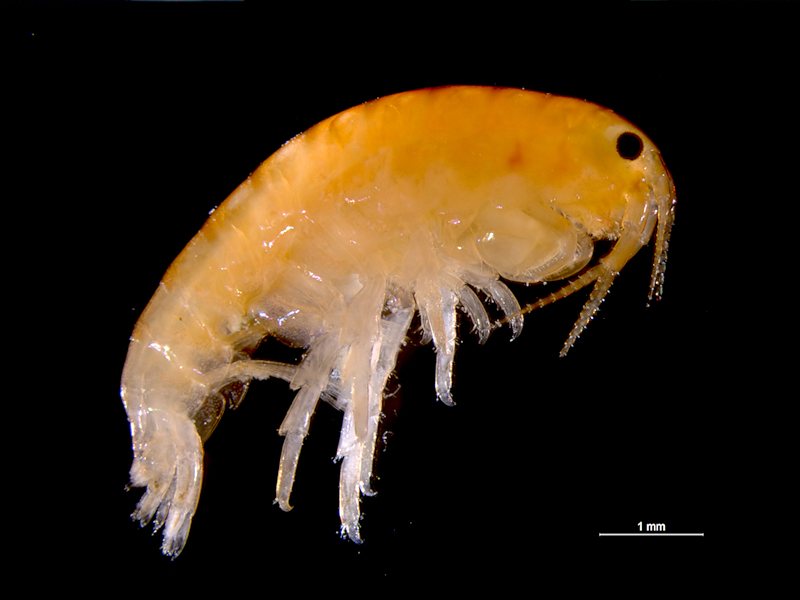
- Apohyale prevostii male

Scientific classification
- Kingdom: Animalia
- Phylum: Arthropoda
- Clade: Pancrustacea
- Class: Malacostraca
- Order: Amphipoda
- Suborder: Senticaudata
- Infraorder: Talitrida
- Parvorder: Talitridira
- Superfamily: Hyaloidea
- Family: Hyalidae; Bulycheva, 1957

= Hyalidae =

Family of crustaceans

Hyalidae is a family of amphipods, containing 12 genera in two unequal subfamilies:

Hyalinae

- Apohyale Bousfield & Hendrycks, 2002
- Hyale Rathke, 1837
- Insula Kunkel, 1910
- Lelehua J. L. Barnard, 1970
- Neobule Haswell, 1879
- Parallorchestes Shoemaker, 1941
- Parhyale Stebbing, 1897
- Protohyale Bousfield & Hendrycks, 2002
- Ptilohyale Bousfield & Hendrycks, 2002
- Ruffohyale Bousfield & Hendrycks, 2002
- Serejohyale Bousfield & Hendrycks, 2002

Hyachelinae

- Hyachelia J. L. Barnard, 1967
