= OrthoFinder =

- Original authors: David Emms; Steven Kelly
- Developers: David Emms; Yi Liu; Laurence Belcher; Jonathan Holmes
- Release: 2015
- Written in: Python
- Operating system: Linux
- Type: Bioinformatics
- License: GNU GPL v3
- Website: github.com/OrthoFinder/OrthoFinder
- Repository: github.com/OrthoFinder/OrthoFinder

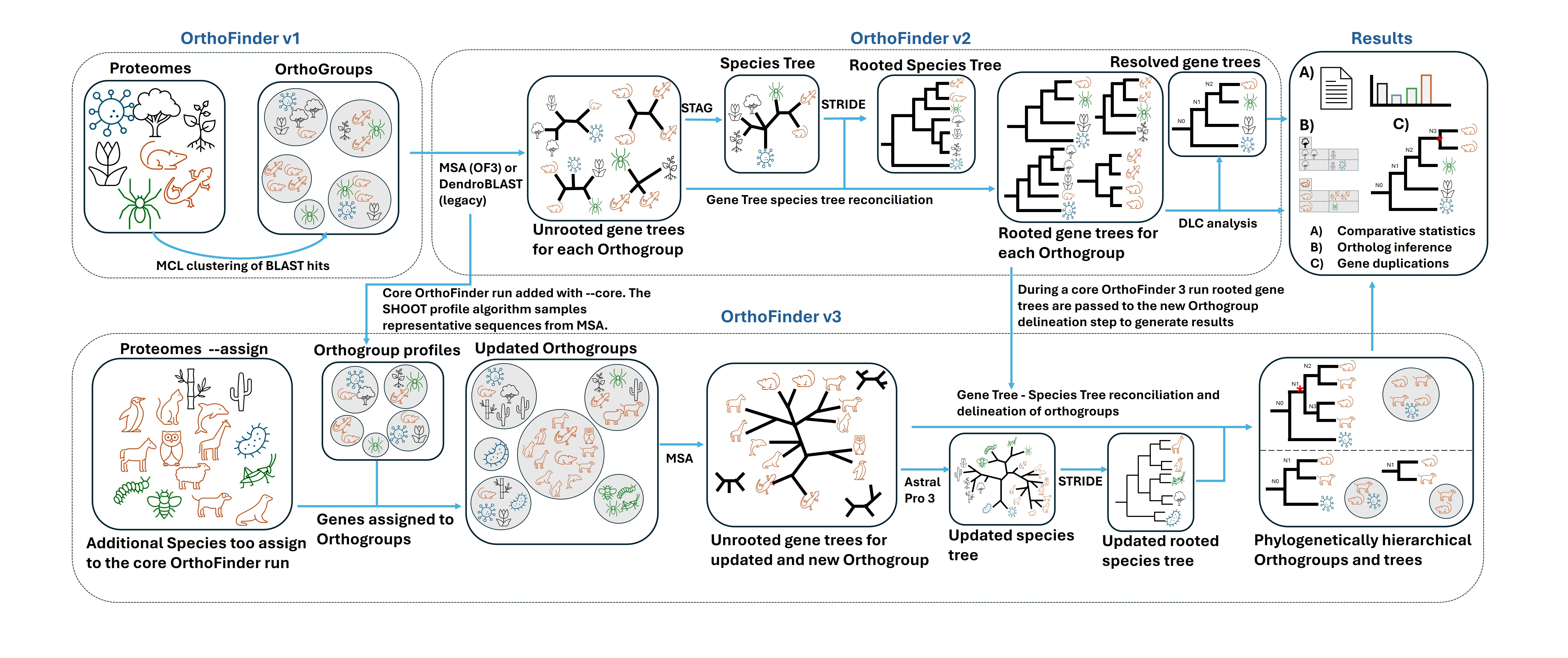
OrthoFinder workflow and outputs.

OrthoFinder is a command-line software tool for comparative genomics. OrthoFinder determines the correspondence between genes in different organisms (also known as orthology analysis). This correspondence provides a framework for understanding the evolution of life on Earth, and enables the extrapolation and transfer of biological knowledge between organisms. In 2026 OrthoFinder was updated to run in linear time with an enhanced scalability workflow by assiging new sequences to an existing OrthoFinder run, representing a major change to the underlying algorithm.

OrthoFinder takes FASTA files of protein sequences as input (one per species) and as output provides:

- Orthogroups
- Rooted Phylogenetic trees of all orthogroups
- A rooted species tree for the set of species included in the input dataset
- Hierarchical orthogroups for each node in the species tree
- Orthologs between all species
- Gene duplication events mapped to branches in the species tree
- Comparative genomic statistics

As of August 2026, the tool has been referenced by more than 10,000 published studies.

== See also ==
- Bioinformatics
- Homology (biology)
- Sequence homology
- Protein family
- Sequence clustering
