= CaBIG =

Cancer Biomedical Informatics Grid

caGrid
- Developers: NCI's Center for Biomedical Informatics and Information Technology (CBIIT), The Ohio State University Research Foundation, The University of Chicago - Argonne National Laboratory, Duke University, Booz Allen Hamilton, SemanticBits LLC, Ekagra Software Technologies
- Type: Grid computing, Web service
- License: BSD 3-Clause
- Website: cagrid.org

The cancer Biomedical Informatics Grid (caBIG) was a US government program to develop an open-source, open access information network called caGrid for secure data exchange on cancer research. The initiative was developed by the National Cancer Institute (part of the National Institutes of Health) and was maintained by the Center for Biomedical Informatics and Information Technology (CBIIT) and program managed by Booz Allen Hamilton. In 2011 a report on caBIG raised significant questions about effectiveness and oversight, and its budget and scope were significantly trimmed. In May 2012, the National Cancer Informatics Program (NCIP) was created as caBIG's successor program.

== History ==
The National Cancer Institute (NCI) of the United States funded the cancer Biomedical Informatics Grid (caBIG) initiative in spring 2004, headed by Kenneth Buetow. Its goal was to connect US biomedical cancer researchers using technology known as grid computing. The program, led by the Center for Bioinformatics and Information Technology (CBIIT), began with a 3-year pilot phase. The pilot phase concluded in March 2007, and a trial was announced. Buetow promoted the program in 2008.

In addition to caGrid, the underlying infrastructure for data sharing among organizations, caBIG developed software tools, data sharing policies, and common standards and vocabularies to facilitate data sharing.

Software tools targeted:

- Collection, analysis, and management of basic research data
- Clinical trials management, from patient enrollment to adverse event reporting and analysis
- Collection, annotation, sharing, and storage of medical imaging data
- Biospecimen management

caBIG sought to provide foundational technology for an approach to biomedicine it called a “learning healthcare system.” This relies on the rapid exchange of information among all sectors of research and care, so that researchers and clinicians are able to collaboratively review and accurately incorporate the latest findings into their work. The ultimate goal was to speed the biomedical research process. It was also promoted for what is often called Personalized Medicine. caBIG technology was used in adaptive clinical trials such as the Investigation of Serial studies to Predict Your Therapeutic Response with Imaging and molecular AnaLysis 2 (I-SPY2), which was designed to use biomarkers to determine the appropriate therapy for women with advanced breast cancer.

== Health information technology ==
Health information technology (HIT) was promoted for management and secure exchange of medical information among researchers, health care providers, and consumers. HIT initiatives mentioning caBIG were: NCI and the American Society of Clinical Oncology initiated a collaboration to create an oncology-specific electronic health record system using caBIG standards for interoperability and that will enable oncologists to manage patient information in an electronic format that accurately captures the specific interventional issues unique to oncology. The Nationwide Health Information Network was an initiative to share patient clinical data across geographically disparate sources and create electronically linked national health information exchange. It might be somehow related.

== Collaborations ==
A BIG Health Consortium was formed in 2008 to promote personalized medicine, but disbanded in 2012. In July 2009, caBIG announced a collaboration with the Dr. Susan Love Research Foundation to build an online cohort of women willing to participate in clinical trials. Called the Army of Women, it had a goal of one million in its database; by December 2009 the site was "launched", and about 30,000 women and men signed up by 2010.

The Cancer Genome Atlas aimed to characterize more than 10,000 tumors across at least 20 cancers by 2015. caBIG provided connectivity, data standards, and tools to collect, organize, share, and analyze the diverse research data in its database. Since 2007, NCI worked with UK National Cancer Research Institute (NCRI). The two organizations shared technologies for collaborative research and the secure exchange of research data using caGrid and the NCRI Oncology Information Exchange (ONIX) web portal announced in August 2009. ONIX shut down in March 2012. The Duke Cancer Institute used caBIG clinical trials tools in their collaboration with the Beijing Cancer Hospital of Peking University.

== Implementation ==
The project intended to connect 65 NCI-designated cancer centers to enable collaborative research. Participating institutions could either “adopt” caBIG tools to share data directly through caGrid, or “adapt” commercial or in-house developed software to be caBIG-compatible. The caBIG program developed software development kits (SDKs) for interoperable software tools, and instructions on the process of adapting existing tools or developing applications to be caBIG-compatible.

The Enterprise Support Network program included domain-specific expertise, and support service providers, third party organizations that provide assistance on a contract-for-services basis. A web portal using the Liferay software was available from 2008 to 2013.

=== Open source ===
Since 2004, the caBIG program used open-source communities, adapted from other public-private partnerships. The caBIG program produced software under contract to software development teams largely within the commercial research community.

In general, software developed under US government contracts is the property of the US government and the US taxpayers. Depending on the terms in specific contracts, they might be accessible only by request under the Freedom of Information Act (FOIA). The timeliness of response to such requests might preclude a requester from ever gaining any secondary value from software released under a FOIA request.

The caBIG program placed the all caBIG software in a software repository freely accessible for download. Open source means anyone can modify the downloaded software; however, the licensing applied to the downloaded software allows greater flexibility than is typical. An individual or enterprise is allowed to contribute the modified code back to the caBIG program but is not required to do so. Likewise, the modifications can be made available as open source but are not required to be made available as open source. The caBIG licensing even allows the use of the caBIG applications and components, combined with additions and modifications, to be released as commercial products. These aspects of the caBIG program actually encourage commercialization of caBIG technology.

=== Results ===
In 2008, GlaxoSmithKline announced it would share cancer cell genomic data with caBIG. Some private companies claimed benefits from caBIG technology in 2010.

A caGrid community web site was created in 2007. The 1.x version of the core software was added to a GitHub project in mid-2013, under the BSD 3-Clause license. It used version 4.03 of the Globus Toolkit, and the Taverna workbench system to manage workflow and the Business Process Execution Language. Software called Introduce was developed around 2006. Contributors included the Ohio State University Center for Clinical and Translational Science, Duke University, University of Chicago - Argonne National Laboratory, and private companies Booz Allen Hamilton, Ekagra Software Technologies and Semantic Bits.

=== Criticism ===
By 2008, some questioned if the program was benefiting large pharmaceutical companies. By 2011, the project had spent an estimated $350 million. Although the goal was considered laudable, much of the software was unevenly adopted after being developed at great expense to compete with commercial offerings. In March 2011, an NCI working group assessment concluded that caBIG "...expanded far beyond those goals to implement an overly complex and ambitious software enterprise of NCI-branded tools, especially in the Clinical Trial Management System (CTMS) space. These have produced limited traction in the cancer community, compete against established commercial vendors, and create financially untenable long-term maintenance and support commitments for the NCI". In 2012, the NCI announced a new program the National Cancer Informatics Program (NCIP) as a successor to caBIG.

== caGrid ==
caGrid
- Developers: NCI's Center for Biomedical Informatics and Information Technology (CBIIT), The Ohio State University Research Foundation, The University of Chicago - Argonne National Laboratory, Duke University, Booz Allen Hamilton, SemanticBits LLC, Ekagra Software Technologies
- Operating system: Cross-platform
- Type: Grid computing, Web service
- License: BSD 3-Clause
- Website: cagrid.org

The caGrid computer network and software supported the cancer Biomedical Informatics Grid (caBIG) initiative of the National Cancer Institute of the US National Institutes of Health.

caBIG was a voluntary virtual informatics infrastructure that connects data, research tools, scientists, and organizations.

In 2013, the National Cancer Informatics Program (NCIP) re-released caGrid under the BSD 3-Clause license, and migrated the source repository to github.

caGrid used version 4.03 of the Globus Toolkit, produced by the Globus Alliance.

=== Program management ===
The caGrid project and much of its funding was managed by Booz Allen Hamilton.

=== Portal ===
The caGrid Portal was a Web-based application built on Liferay that enables users to discover and interact with the services that are available on the caGrid infrastructure. Portal serves as the primary visualization tool for the caGrid middleware. It also served as a caBIG information source. Through the caGrid Portal, users had access to information about caBIG participants, caGrid points of contact (POCs), and caGrid-related news and events.

=== Workflow ===
caGrid workflow uses:

- Active BPEL
- Taverna

=== Contributors ===
- NCI CBIIT Program
- Booz Allen Hamilton
- Ohio State University
- University of Chicago, Argonne National Laboratory
- Duke University
- SemanticBits, LLC
- Ekagra Software Technologies

=== Criticism ===
In March 2011, the NCI published an extensive review of CaBIG, the NCI CBIIT program that funded the caGrid software development (see , ), which included a long list of problems with the program, and recommended that most of the software development projects should be discontinued.
