= Network of Cancer Genes =

Content
- Description: A web resource on systems-level properties of cancer genes
- Organisms: Homo sapiens

Contact
- Research center: Francis Crick Institute
- Laboratory: Cancer Systems Biology Lab - Ciccarelli Lab
- Release date: May 2023

Access
- Website: http://www.network-cancer-genes.org/

Miscellaneous
- Version: 7.1

The Network of Cancer Genes (NCG) is a freely accessible web resource of genes that, when altered in their sequence, drive clonal expansion of normal tissues (healthy drivers) or cancer (cancer drivers). The project was launched in 2010 and has reached its 7th release in 2022. In 2023 the additional annotation of cancer drivers that interact with the tumour immune microenvironment (TIME drivers) was added. NCG7.1 reports information on 3,347 cancer drivers and 95 healthy drivers. Of these, 596 are also TIME drivers. NCG7.1 also reports the system-level properties and the associated publications of each driver, as well as a list possible false positives. NCG7.1 enables advanced searches on the primary anatomical site, cancer type, type of sequencing screens and literature supports.

== Cancer drivers ==
A main feature of cancer cells is to acquire an unstable genome leading to genetic alterations that are major drivers of cancer evolution. NCG7.1 collects 591 well-known (canonical) and 2,756 candidate cancer drivers. These lists derive from the manual curation of 313 original publications, including 3 sources of canonical drivers and 310 cancer sequencing screens. The latter describe whole genome or whole exome sequencing of cancer samples from a total of 41,780 patients from 122 different cancer types.

== Healthy drivers ==
Recent technological advances have enabled detection of genomic instability also in healthy (non cancer) cells driving in situ formation of phenotypically normal clones. NCG7.1 collects 95 healthy drivers from 18 sequencing screens of healthy or diseased (non-cancer) tissues from 32,895 donors. Only 8 of these genes are not cancer drivers, suggesting a high overlap between genetic drivers of cancer and non-cancer evolution.

== TIME drivers ==
Cancer evolution occurs in a complex ecosystem formed of cancer and non-cancer cells that compose the tumour microenvironment (TME). An important component of the TME are immune cells, which may hamper or help tumour growth. Cancer cells engage in a dynamic crosstalk with the TIME that often involves cancer drivers. NCG7.1 annotates 596 that may impact on and be impacted by the TIME. Of these, 205 derive from the manual curation of the literature and 391 are instead computationally predicted.

== Systems level properties ==
Systems-level properties are properties of genes independent on an individual's gene function Some of these properties can be used to distinguish cancer and healthy drivers from the rest of human genes. The systems-level properties reported in NCG are:

- Duplicability: i.e. the presence of additional genomic sequences matching at least 60% of the gene sequence.
- Evolutionary appearance: the presence or absence of ortholog genes in seven branches of the tree of life (Prokaryotes, Eukaryotes, Opisthokonts, Metazoans, Vertebrates, Mammals, Primates)
- Protein-protein interactions: a list of all human proteins interacting with the main protein encoded by the gene of interest and the number of complexes it is part of.
- microRNA-gene interactions: a list of experimentally verified interactions between the gene of interest and human miRNAs.
- Functional properties: a list of the functional classes of the gene of interest.
- Gene expression and protein expression: List of normal tissues and cancer cell lines the gene of interest is expressed in.
- Essentiality: a list of human cell lines in which the gene was found to be essential.

== Previous versions ==
- NCG6.0
- NCG5.0
- NCG4.0
- NCG3.0
- NCG2.0
