= Genevestigator =

- Product type: Application
- Current owner: Nebion AG
- Country: Switzerland
- Introduced: January 1, 2004; 22 years ago
- Website: www.genevestigator.com

Genevestigator is an application consisting of a gene expression database and tools to analyse the data. It exists in two versions, biomedical and plant, depending on the species of the underlying microarray and RNAseq as well as single-cell RNA-sequencing data. It was started in January 2004 by scientists from ETH Zurich and is currently developed and commercialized by Nebion AG.

Researchers and scientists from academia and industry use it to identify, characterize and validate novel drug targets and biomarkers, identify appropriate research models and in general to understand how gene expression changes with different treatments.

== Gene expression database ==
The Genevestigator database comprises transciptomic data from numerous public repositories including GEO, Array Express and renowned cancer research projects as TCGA. Depending on the license agreement, it may also contain data from private gene expression studies. All data are manually curated, quality-controlled and enriched for sample and experiment descriptions derived from corresponding scientific publications.

The number of species from where the samples are derived is constantly increasing. Currently, the biomedical version contains data from human, mouse, and rat used in biomedical research. Gene expression studies are from various research areas including oncology, immunology, neurology, dermatology and cardiovascular diseases. Samples comprise tissue biopsies and cell lines.

The plant version (no longer available) contained both, widely used model species such as arabidopsis and medicago as well as major crop species such as maize, rice, wheat and soybean. After the acquisition of Nebion AG by Immunai Inc. in July 2021, plant data began to be phased out as the biotech company prioritized their focus on biopharma data. As of 2023, the plant data is being maintained on a separate server for remaining users with a license to the plant version of Genevestigator.

== Gene expression tools ==
More than 60,000 scientists from academia and industry use Genevestigator for their work in molecular biology, toxicogenomics, biomarker discovery and target validation. The original scientific publication has been cited over 3,500 times.

The analysis tools are divided into three major sets:

- CONDITION SEARCH tools: find conditions such as a tissue, disease, treatment or genetic background that regulate the gene(s) of interest
- GENE SEARCH tools: find genes that are specifically expressed in the condition(s) of interest
- SIMILARITY SEARCH tools: find genes or conditions that show a similar gene expression pattern

== See also ==
- Spatiotemporal gene expression
