= Transcriptome =

Set of all RNA molecules in one cell or a population of cells

The transcriptome is the set of all RNA molecules (transcripts) in a cell or a population of cells. It includes all of the functional RNA molecules and all other transcripts that may arise by spurious transcription or transcription of non-functional regions such as pseudogenes or virus fragments. A major goal of modern molecular biology is to determine which transcripts are functional and which ones are junk RNA.

The term transcriptome is a portmanteau of the words transcript and genome; it is associated with the process of transcript production during the biological process of transcription. The functional part of the transcriptome is dynamic—it changes with cell type, developmental stage, environment, and stimuli—and therefore represents the active gene expression state rather than the static DNA sequence (genome).

Eukaryotic transcriptomes tend to be more complex than bacterial transcriptomes and the transcriptomes of multicellular eukaryotes are even more complex than those of unicellular eukaryotes.

== Etymology and history ==
The word transcriptome is a portmanteau of the words transcript and genome. It appeared along with other neologisms formed using the suffixes -ome and -omics to denote all studies conducted on a genome-wide scale in the fields of life sciences and technology. As such, transcriptome and transcriptomics were one of the first words to emerge along with genome and proteome. The first study to present a case of a collection of a cDNA library for silk moth mRNA was published in 1979. The first seminal study to mention and investigate the transcriptome of an organism was published in 1997 and it described 60,633 transcripts expressed in S. cerevisiae using serial analysis of gene expression (SAGE). With the rise of high-throughput technologies and bioinformatics and the subsequent increased computational power, it became increasingly efficient and easy to characterize and analyze enormous amount of data. Attempts to characterize the transcriptome became more prominent with the advent of automated DNA sequencing during the 1980s. During the 1990s, expressed sequence tag sequencing was used to identify genes and their fragments. This was followed by techniques such as serial analysis of gene expression (SAGE), cap analysis of gene expression (CAGE), and massively parallel signature sequencing (MPSS).

== Transcription ==
The transcriptome encompasses all the ribonucleic acid (RNA) transcripts present in a given organism or experimental sample. The functional component of the transcriptome includes RNAs that carry genetic information that is responsible for the process of converting DNA into an organism's phenotype. A gene gives rise to a single-stranded RNA molecule through a molecular process known as transcription; this RNA is complementary to the strand of DNA it originated from. The enzyme RNA polymerase attaches to the template DNA strand and catalyzes the addition of ribonucleotides to the 3' end of the growing sequence of the RNA transcript.

In order to initiate its function, RNA polymerase needs to recognize a promoter sequence, located near the transcription start site that defines the beginning of the gene. This process is usually mediated and regulated by transcription factors. Transcription ends at a terminator site that defines the other end of the gene. The terminator site is often identified by termination sequences.

== Types of RNA transcripts ==
Almost all functional transcripts are derived from known genes. The only exceptions are a small number of transcripts that might play a direct role in regulating gene expression near the prompters of known genes. (See Enhancer RNA.)

Genes occupy most of prokaryotic genomes so most of their genomes are transcribed. Many eukaryotic genomes are very large and known genes may take up only a fraction of the genome. In mammals, for example, known genes only account for 40–50% of the genome. Nevertheless, identified transcripts often map to a much larger fraction of the genome suggesting that the transcriptome contains spurious transcripts that do not come from genes. Some of these transcripts are known to be non-functional because they map to transcribed pseudogenes or degenerative transposons and viruses. Others map to unidentified regions of the genome that may be junk DNA.

Spurious transcription is very common in eukaryotes, especially those with large genomes that might contain a lot of junk DNA. Some scientists claim that if a transcript has not been assigned to a known gene then the default assumption must be that it is junk RNA until it has been shown to be functional. This would mean that much of the transcriptome in species with large genomes is probably junk RNA. (See Non-coding RNA.)

The transcriptome includes the transcripts of protein-coding genes (mRNA plus introns) as well as the transcripts of non-coding genes (functional RNAs plus introns).

- Ribosomal RNA/rRNA: Usually the most abundant RNA in the transcriptome.
- Long non-coding RNA/lncRNA: Non-coding RNA transcripts that are more than 200 nucleotides long. Members of this group comprise the largest fraction of the non-coding transcriptome other than introns. It is not known how many of these transcripts are functional and how many are junk RNA.
- transfer RNA/tRNA
- micro RNA/miRNA: 19–24 nucleotides (nt) long. Micro RNAs up- or downregulate expression levels of mRNAs by the process of RNA interference at the post-transcriptional level.
- small interfering RNA/siRNA: 20–24 nt
- small nucleolar RNA/snoRNA
- Piwi-interacting RNA/piRNA: 24–31 nt. They interact with Piwi proteins of the Argonaute family and have a function in targeting and cleaving transposons.
- enhancer RNA/eRNA:

== Scope of study ==
The transcriptome consists of coding regions of mRNA plus non-coding untranslated regions (UTRs), introns, non-coding RNAs, and spurious non-functional transcripts.

Several factors render the content of the transcriptome difficult to establish. These include alternative splicing, RNA editing and alternative transcription among others. Additionally, transcriptome techniques are capable of capturing transcription occurring in a sample at a specific time point, although the content of the transcriptome can change during differentiation. The main aims of transcriptomics are the following: "catalogue all species of transcript, including mRNAs, non-coding RNAs and small RNAs; to determine the transcriptional structure of genes, in terms of their start sites, 5′ and 3′ ends, splicing patterns and other post-transcriptional modifications; and to quantify the changing expression levels of each transcript during development and under different conditions".

The term can be applied to the total set of transcripts in a given organism, or to the specific subset of transcripts present in a particular cell type. Unlike the genome, which is roughly fixed for a given cell line (excluding mutations), the transcriptome can vary with external environmental conditions. Because it includes all mRNA transcripts in the cell, the transcriptome reflects the genes that are being actively expressed at any given time, with the exception of mRNA degradation phenomena such as transcriptional attenuation. The study of transcriptomics, (which includes expression profiling, splice variant analysis etc.), examines the expression level of RNAs in a given cell population, often focusing on mRNA, but sometimes including others such as tRNAs and sRNAs.

== Methods of construction ==
Transcriptomics is the quantitative science that encompasses the assignment of a list of strings ("reads") to the object ("transcripts" in the genome). To calculate the expression strength, the density of reads corresponding to each object is counted. Initially, transcriptomes were analyzed and studied using expressed sequence tags libraries and serial and cap analysis of gene expression (SAGE).

Currently, the two main transcriptomics techniques include DNA microarrays and RNA-Seq. Both techniques require RNA isolation through RNA extraction techniques, followed by its separation from other cellular components and enrichment of mRNA.

There are two general methods of inferring transcriptome sequences. One approach maps sequence reads onto a reference genome, either of the organism itself (whose transcriptome is being studied) or of a closely related species. The other approach, de novo transcriptome assembly, uses software to infer transcripts directly from short sequence reads and is used in organisms with genomes that are not sequenced.

=== DNA microarrays ===
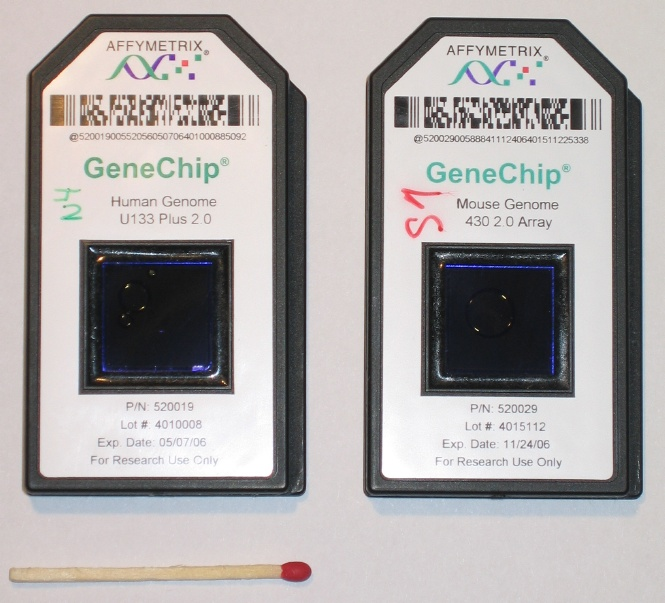
DNA microarray used to detect gene expression in human (left) and mouse (right) samples

The first transcriptome studies were based on microarray techniques (also known as DNA chips). Microarrays consist of thin glass layers with spots on which oligonucleotides, known as "probes" are arrayed; each spot contains a known DNA sequence.

When performing microarray analyses, mRNA is collected from a control and an experimental sample, the latter usually representative of a disease. The RNA of interest is converted to cDNA to increase its stability and marked with fluorophores of two colors, usually green and red, for the two groups. The cDNA is spread onto the surface of the microarray where it hybridizes with oligonucleotides on the chip and a laser is used to scan. The fluorescence intensity on each spot of the microarray corresponds to the level of gene expression and based on the color of the fluorophores selected, it can be determined which of the samples exhibits higher levels of the mRNA of interest.

One microarray usually contains enough oligonucleotides to represent all known genes; however, data obtained using microarrays does not provide information about unknown genes. During the 2010s, microarrays were almost completely replaced by next-generation techniques that are based on DNA sequencing.

=== RNA sequencing ===
RNA sequencing is a next-generation sequencing technology; as such it requires only a small amount of RNA and no previous knowledge of the genome. It allows for both qualitative and quantitative analysis of RNA transcripts, the former allowing discovery of new transcripts and the latter a measure of relative quantities for transcripts in a sample.

The three main steps of sequencing transcriptomes of any biological samples include RNA purification, the synthesis of an RNA or cDNA library and sequencing the library. The RNA purification process is different for short and long RNAs. This step is usually followed by an assessment of RNA quality, with the purpose of avoiding contaminants such as DNA or technical contaminants related to sample processing. RNA quality is measured using UV spectrometry with an absorbance peak of 260 nm. RNA integrity can also be analyzed quantitatively comparing the ratio and intensity of 28S RNA to 18S RNA reported in the RNA Integrity Number (RIN) score. Since mRNA is the species of interest and it represents only 3% of its total content, the RNA sample should be treated to remove rRNA and tRNA and tissue-specific RNA transcripts.

The step of library preparation with the aim of producing short cDNA fragments, begins with RNA fragmentation to transcripts in length between 50 and 300 base pairs. Fragmentation can be enzymatic (RNA endonucleases), chemical (trismagnesium salt buffer, chemical hydrolysis) or mechanical (sonication, nebulisation). Reverse transcription is used to convert the RNA templates into cDNA and three priming methods can be used to achieve it, including oligo-DT, using random primers or ligating special adaptor oligos.

=== Single-cell transcriptomics ===
Transcription can also be studied at the level of individual cells by single-cell transcriptomics. Single-cell RNA sequencing (scRNA-seq) is a recently developed technique that allows the analysis of the transcriptome of single cells, including bacteria. With single-cell transcriptomics, subpopulations of cell types that constitute the tissue of interest are also taken into consideration. This approach allows one to identify whether changes in experimental samples are due to phenotypic cellular changes as opposed to proliferation, with which a specific cell type might be overexpressed in the sample. Additionally, when assessing cellular progression through differentiation, average expression profiles are only able to order cells by time rather than their stage of development and are consequently unable to show trends in gene expression levels specific to certain stages. Single-cell transcriptomic techniques have been used to characterize rare cell populations such as circulating tumor cells, cancer stem cells in solid tumors, and embryonic stem cells (ESCs) in mammalian blastocysts.

Although there are no standardized techniques for single-cell transcriptomics, several steps need to be undertaken. The first step includes cell isolation, which can be performed using low- and high-throughput techniques. This is followed by a qPCR step and then single-cell RNAseq where the RNA of interest is converted into cDNA. Newer developments in single-cell transcriptomics allow for tissue and sub-cellular localization preservation through cryo-sectioning thin slices of tissues and sequencing the transcriptome in each slice. Another technique allows the visualization of single transcripts under a microscope while preserving the spatial information of each individual cell where they are expressed.

== Analysis ==
A number of organism-specific transcriptome databases have been constructed and annotated to aid in the identification of genes that are differentially expressed in distinct cell populations.

RNA-seq is emerging (2013) as the method of choice for measuring transcriptomes of organisms, though the older technique of DNA microarrays is still used. RNA-seq measures the transcription of a specific gene by converting long RNAs into a library of cDNA fragments. The cDNA fragments are then sequenced using high-throughput sequencing technology and aligned to a reference genome or transcriptome which is then used to create an expression profile of the genes.

== Applications ==
=== Humans ===
The number of protein-coding RNA sequences expression by each organ varies significantly between the organs, but also depends on the definitions and methodology used. In general, brain, testes, lymphatic system show the highest activity, and endometrium, gallbladder, seminal vesicle and smooth muscle show the lowest.

=== Mammals ===
The transcriptomes of stem cells and cancer cells are of particular interest to researchers who seek to understand the processes of cellular differentiation and carcinogenesis. Transcriptomic profiling is being studied as a tool for cancer treatment, by matching genetic profiles to recommended treatments. This demonstrates transcriptomics as a powerful tool for the development of personalized cancer treatment. A pipeline using RNA-seq or gene array data can be used to track genetic changes occurring in stem and precursor cells and requires at least three independent gene expression data from the former cell type and mature cells.

Analysis of the transcriptomes of human oocytes and embryos is used to understand the molecular mechanisms and signaling pathways controlling early embryonic development, and could theoretically be a powerful tool in making proper embryo selection in in vitro fertilisation. Analyses of the transcriptome content of the placenta in the first-trimester of pregnancy in in vitro fertilization and embryo transfer (IVT-ET) revealed differences in genetic expression which are associated with higher frequency of adverse perinatal outcomes. Such insight can be used to optimize the practice. Transcriptome analyses can also be used to optimize cryopreservation of oocytes, by lowering injuries associated with the process.

Transcriptomics is an emerging and continually growing field in biomarker discovery for use in assessing the safety of drugs or chemical risk assessment.

Transcriptomes may also be used to infer phylogenetic relationships among individuals or to detect evolutionary patterns of transcriptome conservation.

Transcriptome analyses were used to discover the incidence of antisense transcription, their role in gene expression through interaction with surrounding genes and their abundance in different chromosomes. RNA-seq was also used to show how RNA isoforms, transcripts stemming from the same gene but with different structures, can produce complex phenotypes from limited genomes.

=== Plants ===
Transcriptome analysis have been used to study the evolution and diversification process of plant species. In 2014, the 1000 Plant Genomes Project was completed in which the transcriptomes of 1,124 plant species from the families viridiplantae, glaucophyta and rhodophyta were sequenced. The protein coding sequences were subsequently compared to infer phylogenetic relationships between plants and to characterize the time of their diversification in the process of evolution. Transcriptome studies have been used to characterize and quantify gene expression in mature pollen. Genes involved in cell wall metabolism and cytoskeleton were found to be overexpressed. Transcriptome approaches also allowed to track changes in gene expression through different developmental stages of pollen, ranging from microspore to mature pollen grains; additionally such stages could be compared across species of different plants including Arabidopsis, rice and tobacco.

== Relation to other ome fields ==
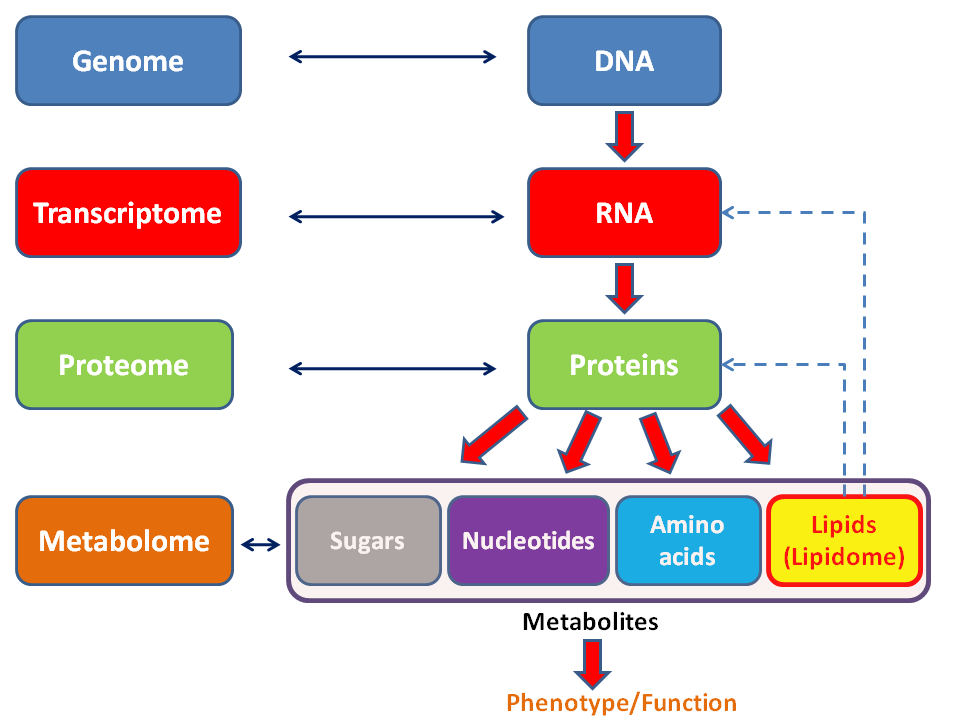
General schema showing the relationships of the genome, transcriptome, proteome, and metabolome (lipidome).

Similar to other -ome based technologies, analysis of the transcriptome allows for an unbiased approach when validating hypotheses experimentally. This approach also allows for the discovery of novel mediators in signaling pathways. As with other -omics based technologies, the transcriptome can be analyzed within the scope of a multiomics approach. It is complementary to metabolomics but contrary to proteomics, a direct association between a transcript and metabolite cannot be established.

There are several -ome fields that can be seen as subcategories of the transcriptome. The exome differs from the transcriptome in that it includes only those RNA molecules found in a specified cell population, and usually includes the amount or concentration of each RNA molecule in addition to the molecular identities. Additionally, the transcriptome also differs from the translatome, which is the set of RNAs undergoing translation.

The term meiome is used in functional genomics to describe the meiotic transcriptome or the set of RNA transcripts produced during the process of meiosis. Meiosis is a key feature of sexually reproducing eukaryotes, and involves the pairing of homologous chromosome, synapse and recombination. Since meiosis in most organisms occurs in a short time period, meiotic transcript profiling is difficult due to the challenge of isolation (or enrichment) of meiotic cells (meiocytes). As with transcriptome analyses, the meiome can be studied at a whole-genome level using large-scale transcriptomic techniques. The meiome has been well-characterized in mammal and yeast systems and somewhat less extensively characterized in plants.

The thanatotranscriptome consists of all RNA transcripts that continue to be expressed or that start getting re-expressed in internal organs of a dead body 24–48 hours following death. Some genes include those that are inhibited after fetal development. If the thanatotranscriptome is related to the process of programmed cell death (apoptosis), it can be referred to as the apoptotic thanatotranscriptome. Analyses of the thanatotranscriptome are used in forensic medicine.

eQTL mapping can be used to complement genomics with transcriptomics; genetic variants at DNA level and gene expression measures at RNA level.

=== Relation to proteome ===
The transcriptome can be seen as a subset of the proteome, that is, the entire set of proteins expressed by a genome.

However, the analysis of relative mRNA expression levels can be complicated by the fact that relatively small changes in mRNA expression can produce large changes in the total amount of the corresponding protein present in the cell. One analysis method, known as gene set enrichment analysis, identifies coregulated gene networks rather than individual genes that are up- or down-regulated in different cell populations.

Although microarray studies can reveal the relative amounts of different mRNAs in the cell, levels of mRNA are not directly proportional to the expression level of the proteins they code for. The number of protein molecules synthesized using a given mRNA molecule as a template is highly dependent on translation-initiation features of the mRNA sequence; in particular, the ability of the translation initiation sequence is a key determinant in the recruiting of ribosomes for protein translation.

== See also ==
- Functional genomics
- Gene expression
- List of omics topics in biology
- Metabolome
- Serial analysis of gene expression
- Transcriptomics technologies
- Translatome
- Transpogene
- Weighted gene co-expression network analysis
