= Gene Expression Omnibus =

Gene expression data repository

Content
- Description: Gene expression profiling and DNA methylation database

Contact
- Research center: National Center for Biotechnology Information
- Primary citation: Edgar R & al. (2002)

Access
- Website: https://www.ncbi.nlm.nih.gov/gds/?term=

Gene Expression Omnibus (GEO) is a database for gene expression profiling and DNA methylation profiling managed by the National Center for Biotechnology Information (NCBI). These high-throughput screening genomics data are derived from microarray or RNA-Seq experimental data. These data need to conform to the minimum information about a microarray experiment (MIAME) format.

== Glossary ==
Abbreviation	Description
GDS	DataSet accession
GPL	Platform accession
GSE	Series accession
GSM	Sample accession
