= List of human protein-coding genes 3 =

Human protein-coding genes listed in the HGNC database
index	Gene symbol	HGNC and UniProt ID(s)
4501	DPP7	HGNC:14892; Q9UHL4
4502	DPP8	HGNC:16490; Q6V1X1
4503	DPP9	HGNC:18648; Q86TI2
4504	DPP10	HGNC:20823; Q8N608
4505	DPPA2	HGNC:19197; Q7Z7J5
4506	DPPA3	HGNC:19199; Q6W0C5
4507	DPPA4	HGNC:19200; Q7L190
4508	DPPA5	HGNC:19201; A6NC42
4509	DPRX	HGNC:32166; A6NFQ7
4510	DPT	HGNC:3011; Q07507
4511	DPY19L1	HGNC:22205; Q2PZI1
4512	DPY19L2	HGNC:19414; Q6NUT2
4513	DPY19L3	HGNC:27120; Q6ZPD9
4514	DPY19L4	HGNC:27829; Q7Z388
4515	DPY30	HGNC:24590; Q9C005
4516	DPYD	HGNC:3012; Q12882
4517	DPYS	HGNC:3013; Q14117
4518	DPYSL2	HGNC:3014; Q16555
4519	DPYSL3	HGNC:3015; Q14195
4520	DPYSL4	HGNC:3016; O14531
4521	DPYSL5	HGNC:20637; Q9BPU6
4522	DQX1	HGNC:20410; Q8TE96
4523	DR1	HGNC:3017; Q01658
4524	DRAM1	HGNC:25645; Q8N682
4525	DRAM2	HGNC:28769; Q6UX65
4526	DRAP1	HGNC:3019; Q14919
4527	DRAXIN	HGNC:25054; Q8NBI3
4528	DRC1	HGNC:24245; Q96MC2
4529	DRC2	HGNC:29937; Q8IXS2
4530	DRC3	HGNC:25384; Q9H069
4531	DRC4	HGNC:4166; O95995
4532	DRC5	HGNC:11693; Q5JU00
4533	DRC7	HGNC:25289; Q8IY82
4534	DRC8	HGNC:28166; Q5VUJ9
4535	DRC9	HGNC:25251; Q9H095
4536	DRC10	HGNC:25168; Q96DY2
4537	DRC11	HGNC:26195; Q86XH1
4538	DRC11L	HGNC:22831; A6NCM1
4539	DRC12	HGNC:27446; Q494R4
4540	DRD1	HGNC:3020; P21728
4541	DRD2	HGNC:3023; P14416
4542	DRD3	HGNC:3024; P35462
4543	DRD4	HGNC:3025; P21917
4544	DRD5	HGNC:3026; P21918
4545	DRG1	HGNC:3029; Q9Y295
4546	DRG2	HGNC:3030; P55039
4547	DRGX	HGNC:21536; A6NNA5
4548	DRICH1	HGNC:28031; Q6PGQ1
4549	DROSHA	HGNC:17904; Q9NRR4
4550	DRP2	HGNC:3032; Q13474
4551	DSC1	HGNC:3035; Q08554
4552	DSC2	HGNC:3036; Q02487
4553	DSC3	HGNC:3037; Q14574
4554	DSCAM	HGNC:3039; O60469
4555	DSCAML1	HGNC:14656; Q8TD84
4556	DSCC1	HGNC:24453; Q9BVC3
4557	DSE	HGNC:21144; Q9UL01
4558	DSEL	HGNC:18144; Q8IZU8
4559	DSG1	HGNC:3048; Q02413
4560	DSG2	HGNC:3049; Q14126
4561	DSG3	HGNC:3050; P32926
4562	DSG4	HGNC:21307; Q86SJ6
4563	DSN1	HGNC:16165; Q9H410
4564	DSP	HGNC:3052; P15924
4565	DSPP	HGNC:3054; Q9NZW4
4566	DST	HGNC:1090; Q03001
4567	DSTN	HGNC:15750; P60981
4568	DSTYK	HGNC:29043; Q6XUX3
4569	DTD1	HGNC:16219; Q8TEA8
4570	DTD2	HGNC:20277; Q96FN9
4571	DTHD1	HGNC:37261; Q6ZMT9
4572	DTL	HGNC:30288; Q9NZJ0
4573	DTNA	HGNC:3057; Q9Y4J8
4574	DTNB	HGNC:3058; O60941
4575	DTNBP1	HGNC:17328; Q96EV8
4576	DTWD1	HGNC:30926; Q8N5C7
4577	DTWD2	HGNC:19334; Q8NBA8
4578	DTX1	HGNC:3060; Q86Y01
4579	DTX2	HGNC:15973; Q86UW9
4580	DTX3	HGNC:24457; Q8N9I9
4581	DTX3L	HGNC:30323; Q8TDB6
4582	DTX4	HGNC:29151; Q9Y2E6
4583	DTYMK	HGNC:3061; P23919
4584	DUOX1	HGNC:3062; Q9NRD9
4585	DUOX2	HGNC:13273; Q9NRD8
4586	DUOXA1	HGNC:26507; Q1HG43
4587	DUOXA2	HGNC:32698; Q1HG44
4588	DUS1L	HGNC:30086; Q6P1R4
4589	DUS2	HGNC:26014; Q9NX74
4590	DUS3L	HGNC:26920; Q96G46
4591	DUS4L	HGNC:21517; O95620
4592	DUSP1	HGNC:3064; P28562
4593	DUSP2	HGNC:3068; Q05923
4594	DUSP3	HGNC:3069; P51452
4595	DUSP4	HGNC:3070; Q13115
4596	DUSP5	HGNC:3071; Q16690
4597	DUSP6	HGNC:3072; Q16828
4598	DUSP7	HGNC:3073; Q16829
4599	DUSP8	HGNC:3074; Q13202
4600	DUSP9	HGNC:3076; Q99956
4601	DUSP10	HGNC:3065; Q9Y6W6
4602	DUSP11	HGNC:3066; O75319
4603	DUSP12	HGNC:3067; Q9UNI6
4604	DUSP13A	HGNC:56772; Q6B8I1
4605	DUSP13B	HGNC:19681; Q9UII6
4606	DUSP14	HGNC:17007; O95147
4607	DUSP15	HGNC:16236; Q9H1R2
4608	DUSP16	HGNC:17909; Q9BY84
4609	DUSP18	HGNC:18484; Q8NEJ0
4610	DUSP19	HGNC:18894; Q8WTR2
4611	DUSP21	HGNC:20476; Q9H596
4612	DUSP22	HGNC:16077; Q9NRW4
4613	DUSP23	HGNC:21480; Q9BVJ7
4614	DUSP26	HGNC:28161; Q9BV47
4615	DUSP28	HGNC:33237; Q4G0W2
4616	DUSP29	HGNC:23481; Q68J44
4617	DUT	HGNC:3078; P33316
4618	DUX1	HGNC:3079; O43812
4619	DUX3	HGNC:3081; Q96PT4
4620	DUX4	HGNC:50800; Q9UBX2
4621	DUX5	HGNC:3083; Q96PT3
4622	DUXA	HGNC:32179; A6NLW8
4623	DUXB	HGNC:33345; A0A1W2PPF3
4624	DVL1	HGNC:3084; O14640
4625	DVL2	HGNC:3086; O14641
4626	DVL3	HGNC:3087; Q92997
4627	DXO	HGNC:2992; O77932
4628	DYDC1	HGNC:23460; Q8WWB3
4629	DYDC2	HGNC:23468; Q96IM9
4630	DYM	HGNC:21317; Q7RTS9
4631	DYNAP	HGNC:26808; Q8N1N2
4632	DYNC1H1	HGNC:2961; Q14204
4633	DYNC1I1	HGNC:2963; O14576
4634	DYNC1I2	HGNC:2964; Q13409
4635	DYNC1LI1	HGNC:18745; Q9Y6G9
4636	DYNC1LI2	HGNC:2966; O43237
4637	DYNC2H1	HGNC:2962; Q8NCM8
4638	DYNC2I1	HGNC:21862; Q8WVS4
4639	DYNC2I2	HGNC:28296; Q96EX3
4640	DYNC2LI1	HGNC:24595; Q8TCX1
4641	DYNLL1	HGNC:15476; P63167
4642	DYNLL2	HGNC:24596; Q96FJ2
4643	DYNLRB1	HGNC:15468; Q9NP97
4644	DYNLRB2	HGNC:15467; Q8TF09
4645	DYNLT1	HGNC:11697; P63172
4646	DYNLT2	HGNC:11695; Q8IZS6
4647	DYNLT2B	HGNC:28482; Q8WW35
4648	DYNLT3	HGNC:11694; P51808
4649	DYNLT4	HGNC:32315; Q5JR98
4650	DYNLT5	HGNC:26882; Q8N7M0
4651	DYRK1A	HGNC:3091; Q13627
4652	DYRK1B	HGNC:3092; Q9Y463
4653	DYRK2	HGNC:3093; Q92630
4654	DYRK3	HGNC:3094; O43781
4655	DYRK4	HGNC:3095; Q9NR20
4656	DYSF	HGNC:3097; O75923
4657	DYTN	HGNC:23279; A2CJ06
4658	DZANK1	HGNC:15858; Q9NVP4
4659	DZIP1	HGNC:20908; Q86YF9
4660	DZIP1L	HGNC:26551; Q8IYY4
4661	DZIP3	HGNC:30938; Q86Y13
4662	E2F1	HGNC:3113; Q01094
4663	E2F2	HGNC:3114; Q14209
4664	E2F3	HGNC:3115; O00716
4665	E2F4	HGNC:3118; Q16254
4666	E2F5	HGNC:3119; Q15329
4667	E2F6	HGNC:3120; O75461
4668	E2F7	HGNC:23820; Q96AV8
4669	E2F8	HGNC:24727; A0AVK6
4670	E4F1	HGNC:3121; Q66K89
4671	EAF1	HGNC:20907; Q96JC9
4672	EAF2	HGNC:23115; Q96CJ1
4673	EAPP	HGNC:19312; Q56P03
4674	EARS2	HGNC:29419; Q5JPH6
4675	EBAG9	HGNC:3123; O00559
4676	EBF1	HGNC:3126; Q9UH73
4677	EBF2	HGNC:19090; Q9HAK2
4678	EBF3	HGNC:19087; Q9H4W6
4679	EBF4	HGNC:29278; Q9BQW3
4680	EBI3	HGNC:3129; Q14213
4681	EBLN1	HGNC:39430; P0CF75
4682	EBLN2	HGNC:25493; Q6P2I7
4683	EBNA1BP2	HGNC:15531; Q99848
4684	EBP	HGNC:3133; Q15125
4685	EBPL	HGNC:18061; Q9BY08
4686	ECD	HGNC:17029; O95905
4687	ECE1	HGNC:3146; P42892
4688	ECE2	HGNC:13275; P0DPD6
4689	ECEL1	HGNC:3147; O95672
4690	ECH1	HGNC:3149; Q13011
4691	ECHDC1	HGNC:21489; Q9NTX5
4692	ECHDC2	HGNC:23408; Q86YB7
4693	ECHDC3	HGNC:23489; Q96DC8
4694	ECHS1	HGNC:3151; P30084
4695	ECI1	HGNC:2703; P42126
4696	ECI2	HGNC:14601; O75521
4697	ECM1	HGNC:3153; Q16610
4698	ECM2	HGNC:3154; O94769
4699	ECPAS	HGNC:29020; Q5VYK3
4700	ECRG4	HGNC:24642; Q9H1Z8
4701	ECSCR	HGNC:35454; Q19T08
4702	ECSIT	HGNC:29548; Q9BQ95
4703	ECT2	HGNC:3155; Q9H8V3
4704	ECT2L	HGNC:21118; Q008S8
4705	EDA	HGNC:3157; Q92838
4706	EDA2R	HGNC:17756; Q9HAV5
4707	EDAR	HGNC:2895; Q9UNE0
4708	EDARADD	HGNC:14341; Q8WWZ3
4709	EDC3	HGNC:26114; Q96F86
4710	EDC4	HGNC:17157; Q6P2E9
4711	EDDM3A	HGNC:16978; Q14507
4712	EDDM3B	HGNC:19223; P56851
4713	EDDM13	HGNC:53168; A0A1B0GTR0
4714	EDEM1	HGNC:18967; Q92611
4715	EDEM2	HGNC:15877; Q9BV94
4716	EDEM3	HGNC:16787; Q9BZQ6
4717	EDF1	HGNC:3164; O60869
4718	EDIL3	HGNC:3173; O43854
4719	EDN1	HGNC:3176; P05305
4720	EDN2	HGNC:3177; P20800
4721	EDN3	HGNC:3178; P14138
4722	EDNRA	HGNC:3179; P25101
4723	EDNRB	HGNC:3180; P24530
4724	EDRF1	HGNC:24640; Q3B7T1
4725	EEA1	HGNC:3185; Q15075
4726	EED	HGNC:3188; O75530
4727	EEF1A1	HGNC:3189; P68104
4728	EEF1A2	HGNC:3192; Q05639
4729	EEF1AKMT1	HGNC:27351; Q8WVE0
4730	EEF1AKMT2	HGNC:33787; Q5JPI9
4731	EEF1AKMT3	HGNC:24936; Q96AZ1
4732	EEF1AKMT4	HGNC:53611; P0DPD7
4733	EEF1B2	HGNC:3208; P24534
4734	EEF1D	HGNC:3211; P29692
4735	EEF1E1	HGNC:3212; O43324
4736	EEF1G	HGNC:3213; P26641
4737	EEF2	HGNC:3214; P13639
4738	EEF2K	HGNC:24615; O00418
4739	EEF2KMT	HGNC:32221; Q96G04
4740	EEFSEC	HGNC:24614; P57772
4741	EEIG1	HGNC:31419; Q5T9C2
4742	EEIG2	HGNC:27637; Q5T8I3
4743	EEPD1	HGNC:22223; Q7L9B9
4744	EFCAB3	HGNC:26379; Q8N7B9
4745	EFCAB5	HGNC:24801; A4FU69
4746	EFCAB6	HGNC:24204; Q5THR3
4747	EFCAB7	HGNC:29379; A8K855
4748	EFCAB8	HGNC:34532; A8MWE9
4749	EFCAB9	HGNC:34530; A8MZ26
4750	EFCAB10	HGNC:34531; A6NFE3
4751	EFCAB11	HGNC:20357; Q9BUY7
4752	EFCAB12	HGNC:28061; Q6NXP0
4753	EFCAB13	HGNC:26864; Q8IY85
4754	EFCAB14	HGNC:29051; O75071
4755	EFCC1	HGNC:25692; Q9HA90
4756	EFEMP1	HGNC:3218; Q12805
4757	EFEMP2	HGNC:3219; O95967
4758	EFHB	HGNC:26330; Q8N7U6
4759	EFHC1	HGNC:16406; Q5JVL4
4760	EFHC2	HGNC:26233; Q5JST6
4761	EFHD1	HGNC:29556; Q9BUP0
4762	EFHD2	HGNC:28670; Q96C19
4763	EFL1	HGNC:25789; Q7Z2Z2
4764	EFNA1	HGNC:3221; P20827
4765	EFNA2	HGNC:3222; O43921
4766	EFNA3	HGNC:3223; P52797
4767	EFNA4	HGNC:3224; P52798
4768	EFNA5	HGNC:3225; P52803
4769	EFNB1	HGNC:3226; P98172
4770	EFNB2	HGNC:3227; P52799
4771	EFNB3	HGNC:3228; Q15768
4772	EFR3A	HGNC:28970; Q14156
4773	EFR3B	HGNC:29155; Q9Y2G0
4774	EFS	HGNC:16898; O43281
4775	EFTUD2	HGNC:30858; Q15029
4776	EGF	HGNC:3229; P01133
4777	EGFL6	HGNC:3235; Q8IUX8
4778	EGFL7	HGNC:20594; Q9UHF1
4779	EGFL8	HGNC:13944; Q99944
4780	EGFLAM	HGNC:26810; Q63HQ2
4781	EGFR	HGNC:3236; P00533
4782	EGLN1	HGNC:1232; Q9GZT9
4783	EGLN2	HGNC:14660; Q96KS0
4784	EGLN3	HGNC:14661; Q9H6Z9
4785	EGR1	HGNC:3238; P18146
4786	EGR2	HGNC:3239; P11161
4787	EGR3	HGNC:3240; Q06889
4788	EGR4	HGNC:3241; Q05215
4789	EHBP1	HGNC:29144; Q8NDI1
4790	EHBP1L1	HGNC:30682; Q8N3D4
4791	EHD1	HGNC:3242; Q9H4M9
4792	EHD2	HGNC:3243; Q9NZN4
4793	EHD3	HGNC:3244; Q9NZN3
4794	EHD4	HGNC:3245; Q9H223
4795	EHF	HGNC:3246; Q9NZC4
4796	EHHADH	HGNC:3247; Q08426
4797	EHMT1	HGNC:24650; Q9H9B1
4798	EHMT2	HGNC:14129; Q96KQ7
4799	EI24	HGNC:13276; O14681
4800	EID1	HGNC:1191; Q9Y6B2
4801	EID2	HGNC:28292; Q8N6I1
4802	EID2B	HGNC:26796; Q96D98
4803	EID3	HGNC:32961; Q8N140
4804	EIF1	HGNC:3249; P41567
4805	EIF1AD	HGNC:28147; Q8N9N8
4806	EIF1AX	HGNC:3250; P47813
4807	EIF1AY	HGNC:3252; O14602
4808	EIF1B	HGNC:30792; O60739
4809	EIF2A	HGNC:3254; Q9BY44
4810	EIF2AK1	HGNC:24921; Q9BQI3
4811	EIF2AK2	HGNC:9437; P19525
4812	EIF2AK3	HGNC:3255; Q9NZJ5
4813	EIF2AK4	HGNC:19687; Q9P2K8
4814	EIF2B1	HGNC:3257; Q14232
4815	EIF2B2	HGNC:3258; P49770
4816	EIF2B3	HGNC:3259; Q9NR50
4817	EIF2B4	HGNC:3260; Q9UI10
4818	EIF2B5	HGNC:3261; Q13144
4819	EIF2D	HGNC:6583; P41214
4820	EIF2S1	HGNC:3265; P05198
4821	EIF2S2	HGNC:3266; P20042
4822	EIF2S3	HGNC:3267; P41091
4823	EIF2S3B	HGNC:43863; Q2VIR3
4824	EIF3A	HGNC:3271; Q14152
4825	EIF3B	HGNC:3280; P55884
4826	EIF3C	HGNC:3279; Q99613
4827	EIF3CL	HGNC:26347; B5ME19
4828	EIF3D	HGNC:3278; O15371
4829	EIF3E	HGNC:3277; P60228
4830	EIF3F	HGNC:3275; O00303
4831	EIF3G	HGNC:3274; O75821
4832	EIF3H	HGNC:3273; O15372
4833	EIF3I	HGNC:3272; Q13347
4834	EIF3J	HGNC:3270; O75822
4835	EIF3K	HGNC:24656; Q9UBQ5
4836	EIF3L	HGNC:18138; Q9Y262
4837	EIF3M	HGNC:24460; Q7L2H7
4838	EIF4A1	HGNC:3282; P60842
4839	EIF4A2	HGNC:3284; Q14240
4840	EIF4A3	HGNC:18683; P38919
4841	EIF4B	HGNC:3285; P23588
4842	EIF4E	HGNC:3287; P06730
4843	EIF4E1B	HGNC:33179; A6NMX2
4844	EIF4E2	HGNC:3293; O60573
4845	EIF4E3	HGNC:31837; Q8N5X7
4846	EIF4EBP1	HGNC:3288; Q13541
4847	EIF4EBP2	HGNC:3289; Q13542
4848	EIF4EBP3	HGNC:3290; O60516
4849	EIF4ENIF1	HGNC:16687; Q9NRA8
4850	EIF4G1	HGNC:3296; Q04637
4851	EIF4G2	HGNC:3297; P78344
4852	EIF4G3	HGNC:3298; O43432
4853	EIF4H	HGNC:12741; Q15056
4854	EIF5	HGNC:3299; P55010
4855	EIF5A	HGNC:3300; P63241
4856	EIF5A2	HGNC:3301; Q9GZV4
4857	EIF5AL1	HGNC:17419; Q6IS14
4858	EIF5B	HGNC:30793; O60841
4859	EIF6	HGNC:6159; P56537
4860	EIPR1	HGNC:12383; Q53HC9
4861	ELAC1	HGNC:14197; Q9H777
4862	ELAC2	HGNC:14198; Q9BQ52
4863	ELANE	HGNC:3309; P08246
4864	ELAPOR1	HGNC:29618; Q6UXG2
4865	ELAPOR2	HGNC:21945; A8MWY0
4866	ELAVL1	HGNC:3312; Q15717
4867	ELAVL2	HGNC:3313; Q12926
4868	ELAVL3	HGNC:3314; Q14576
4869	ELAVL4	HGNC:3315; P26378
4870	ELF1	HGNC:3316; P32519
4871	ELF2	HGNC:3317; Q15723
4872	ELF3	HGNC:3318; P78545
4873	ELF4	HGNC:3319; Q99607
4874	ELF5	HGNC:3320; Q9UKW6
4875	ELFN1	HGNC:33154; P0C7U0
4876	ELFN2	HGNC:29396; Q5R3F8
4877	ELK1	HGNC:3321; P19419
4878	ELK3	HGNC:3325; P41970
4879	ELK4	HGNC:3326; P28324
4880	ELL	HGNC:23114; P55199
4881	ELL2	HGNC:17064; O00472
4882	ELL3	HGNC:23113; Q9HB65
4883	ELMO1	HGNC:16286; Q92556
4884	ELMO2	HGNC:17233; Q96JJ3
4885	ELMO3	HGNC:17289; Q96BJ8
4886	ELMOD1	HGNC:25334; Q8N336
4887	ELMOD2	HGNC:28111; Q8IZ81
4888	ELMOD3	HGNC:26158; Q96FG2
4889	ELN	HGNC:3327; P15502
4890	ELOA	HGNC:11620; Q14241
4891	ELOA2	HGNC:30771; Q8IYF1
4892	ELOB	HGNC:11619; Q15370
4893	ELOC	HGNC:11617; Q15369
4894	ELOF1	HGNC:28691; P60002
4895	ELOVL1	HGNC:14418; Q9BW60
4896	ELOVL2	HGNC:14416; Q9NXB9
4897	ELOVL3	HGNC:18047; Q9HB03
4898	ELOVL4	HGNC:14415; Q9GZR5
4899	ELOVL5	HGNC:21308; Q9NYP7
4900	ELOVL6	HGNC:15829; Q9H5J4
4901	ELOVL7	HGNC:26292; A1L3X0
4902	ELP1	HGNC:5959; O95163
4903	ELP2	HGNC:18248; Q6IA86
4904	ELP3	HGNC:20696; Q9H9T3
4905	ELP4	HGNC:1171; Q96EB1
4906	ELP5	HGNC:30617; Q8TE02
4907	ELP6	HGNC:25976; Q0PNE2
4908	ELSPBP1	HGNC:14417; Q96BH3
4909	EMB	HGNC:30465; Q6PCB8
4910	EMC1	HGNC:28957; Q8N766
4911	EMC2	HGNC:28963; Q15006
4912	EMC3	HGNC:23999; Q9P0I2
4913	EMC4	HGNC:28032; Q5J8M3
4914	EMC6	HGNC:28430; Q9BV81
4915	EMC7	HGNC:24301; Q9NPA0
4916	EMC8	HGNC:7864; O43402
4917	EMC9	HGNC:20273; Q9Y3B6
4918	EMC10	HGNC:27609; Q5UCC4
4919	EMCN	HGNC:16041; Q9ULC0
4920	EMD	HGNC:3331; P50402
4921	EME1	HGNC:24965; Q96AY2
4922	EME2	HGNC:27289; A4GXA9
4923	EMG1	HGNC:16912; Q92979
4924	EMID1	HGNC:18036; Q96A84
4925	EMILIN1	HGNC:19880; Q9Y6C2
4926	EMILIN2	HGNC:19881; Q9BXX0
4927	EMILIN3	HGNC:16123; Q9NT22
4928	EML1	HGNC:3330; O00423
4929	EML2	HGNC:18035; O95834
4930	EML3	HGNC:26666; Q32P44
4931	EML4	HGNC:1316; Q9HC35
4932	EML5	HGNC:18197; Q05BV3
4933	EML6	HGNC:35412; Q6ZMW3
4934	EMP1	HGNC:3333; P54849
4935	EMP2	HGNC:3334; P54851
4936	EMP3	HGNC:3335; P54852
4937	EMSY	HGNC:18071; Q7Z589
4938	EMX1	HGNC:3340; Q04741
4939	EMX2	HGNC:3341; Q04743
4940	EN1	HGNC:3342; Q05925
4941	EN2	HGNC:3343; P19622
4942	ENAH	HGNC:18271; Q8N8S7
4943	ENAM	HGNC:3344; Q9NRM1
4944	ENC1	HGNC:3345; O14682
4945	ENDOD1	HGNC:29129; O94919
4946	ENDOG	HGNC:3346; Q14249
4947	ENDOU	HGNC:14369; P21128
4948	ENDOV	HGNC:26640; Q8N8Q3
4949	ENG	HGNC:3349; P17813
4950	ENGASE	HGNC:24622; Q8NFI3
4951	ENHO	HGNC:24838; Q6UWT2
4952	ENKD1	HGNC:25246; Q9H0I2
4953	ENKUR	HGNC:28388; Q8TC29
4954	ENO1	HGNC:3350; P06733
4955	ENO2	HGNC:3353; P09104
4956	ENO3	HGNC:3354; P13929
4957	ENO4	HGNC:31670; A6NNW6
4958	ENOPH1	HGNC:24599; Q9UHY7
4959	ENOSF1	HGNC:30365; Q7L5Y1
4960	ENOX1	HGNC:25474; Q8TC92
4961	ENOX2	HGNC:2259; Q16206
4962	ENPEP	HGNC:3355; Q07075
4963	ENPP1	HGNC:3356; P22413
4964	ENPP2	HGNC:3357; Q13822
4965	ENPP3	HGNC:3358; O14638
4966	ENPP4	HGNC:3359; Q9Y6X5
4967	ENPP5	HGNC:13717; Q9UJA9
4968	ENPP6	HGNC:23409; Q6UWR7
4969	ENPP7	HGNC:23764; Q6UWV6
4970	ENSA	HGNC:3360; O43768
4971	ENTHD1	HGNC:26352; Q8IYW4
4972	ENTPD1	HGNC:3363; P49961
4973	ENTPD2	HGNC:3364; Q9Y5L3
4974	ENTPD3	HGNC:3365; O75355
4975	ENTPD4	HGNC:14573; Q9Y227
4976	ENTPD5	HGNC:3367; O75356
4977	ENTPD6	HGNC:3368; O75354
4978	ENTPD7	HGNC:19745; Q9NQZ7
4979	ENTPD8	HGNC:24860; Q5MY95
4980	ENTR1	HGNC:10667; Q96C92
4981	ENTREP1	HGNC:24820; Q15884
4982	ENTREP2	HGNC:29075; O60320
4983	ENTREP3	HGNC:1233; P81408
4984	ENY2	HGNC:24449; Q9NPA8
4985	EOGT	HGNC:28526; Q5NDL2
4986	EOLA1	HGNC:28089; Q8TE69
4987	EOLA2	HGNC:17402; Q96DE9
4988	EOMES	HGNC:3372; O95936
4989	EP300	HGNC:3373; Q09472
4990	EP400	HGNC:11958; Q96L91
4991	EPAS1	HGNC:3374; Q99814
4992	EPB41	HGNC:3377; P11171
4993	EPB41L1	HGNC:3378; Q9H4G0
4994	EPB41L2	HGNC:3379; O43491
4995	EPB41L3	HGNC:3380; Q9Y2J2
4996	EPB41L4A	HGNC:13278; Q9HCS5
4997	EPB41L4B	HGNC:19818; Q9H329
4998	EPB41L5	HGNC:19819; Q9HCM4
4999	EPB42	HGNC:3381; P16452
5000	EPC1	HGNC:19876; Q9H2F5
5001	EPC2	HGNC:24543; Q52LR7
5002	EPCAM	HGNC:11529; P16422
5003	EPCIP	HGNC:1305; Q9NYP8
5004	EPDR1	HGNC:17572; Q9UM22
5005	EPG5	HGNC:29331; Q9HCE0
5006	EPGN	HGNC:17470; Q6UW88
5007	EPHA1	HGNC:3385; P21709
5008	EPHA2	HGNC:3386; P29317
5009	EPHA3	HGNC:3387; P29320
5010	EPHA4	HGNC:3388; P54764
5011	EPHA5	HGNC:3389; P54756
5012	EPHA6	HGNC:19296; Q9UF33
5013	EPHA7	HGNC:3390; Q15375
5014	EPHA8	HGNC:3391; P29322
5015	EPHA10	HGNC:19987; Q5JZY3
5016	EPHB1	HGNC:3392; P54762
5017	EPHB2	HGNC:3393; P29323
5018	EPHB3	HGNC:3394; P54753
5019	EPHB4	HGNC:3395; P54760
5020	EPHB6	HGNC:3396; O15197
5021	EPHX1	HGNC:3401; P07099
5022	EPHX2	HGNC:3402; P34913
5023	EPHX3	HGNC:23760; Q9H6B9
5024	EPHX4	HGNC:23758; Q8IUS5
5025	EPM2A	HGNC:3413; B3EWF7, O95278
5026	EPM2AIP1	HGNC:19735; Q7L775
5027	EPN1	HGNC:21604; Q9Y6I3
5028	EPN2	HGNC:18639; O95208
5029	EPN3	HGNC:18235; Q9H201
5030	EPO	HGNC:3415; P01588
5031	EPOP	HGNC:34493; A6NHQ4
5032	EPOR	HGNC:3416; P19235
5033	EPPIN	HGNC:15932; O95925
5034	EPPK1	HGNC:15577; P58107
5035	EPRS1	HGNC:3418; P07814
5036	EPS8	HGNC:3420; Q12929
5037	EPS8L1	HGNC:21295; Q8TE68
5038	EPS8L2	HGNC:21296; Q9H6S3
5039	EPS8L3	HGNC:21297; Q8TE67
5040	EPS15	HGNC:3419; P42566
5041	EPS15L1	HGNC:24634; Q9UBC2
5042	EPSTI1	HGNC:16465; Q96J88
5043	EPX	HGNC:3423; P11678
5044	EPYC	HGNC:3053; Q99645
5045	EQTN	HGNC:1359; Q9NQ60
5046	ERAL1	HGNC:3424; O75616
5047	ERAP1	HGNC:18173; Q9NZ08
5048	ERAP2	HGNC:29499; Q6P179
5049	ERAS	HGNC:5174; Q7Z444
5050	ERBB2	HGNC:3430; P04626
5051	ERBB3	HGNC:3431; P21860
5052	ERBB4	HGNC:3432; Q15303
5053	ERBIN	HGNC:15842; Q96RT1
5054	ERC1	HGNC:17072; Q8IUD2
5055	ERC2	HGNC:31922; O15083
5056	ERCC1	HGNC:3433; P07992
5057	ERCC2	HGNC:3434; P18074
5058	ERCC3	HGNC:3435; P19447
5059	ERCC4	HGNC:3436; Q92889
5060	ERCC5	HGNC:3437; P28715
5061	ERCC6	HGNC:3438; P0DP91, Q03468
5062	ERCC6L	HGNC:20794; Q2NKX8
5063	ERCC6L2	HGNC:26922; Q5T890
5064	ERCC8	HGNC:3439; Q13216
5065	EREG	HGNC:3443; O14944
5066	ERF	HGNC:3444; P50548
5067	ERFE	HGNC:26727; Q4G0M1
5068	ERFL	HGNC:53894; A0A1W2PQ73
5069	ERG	HGNC:3446; P11308
5070	ERG28	HGNC:1187; Q9UKR5
5071	ERGIC1	HGNC:29205; Q969X5
5072	ERGIC2	HGNC:30208; Q96RQ1
5073	ERGIC3	HGNC:15927; Q9Y282
5074	ERH	HGNC:3447; P84090
5075	ERI1	HGNC:23994; Q8IV48
5076	ERI2	HGNC:30541; A8K979
5077	ERI3	HGNC:17276; O43414
5078	ERICH1	HGNC:27234; Q86X53
5079	ERICH2	HGNC:44395; A1L162
5080	ERICH3	HGNC:25346; Q5RHP9
5081	ERICH4	HGNC:34497; A6NGS2
5082	ERICH5	HGNC:26823; Q6P6B1
5083	ERICH6	HGNC:28602; Q7L0X2
5084	ERICH6B	HGNC:26523; Q5W0A0
5085	ERLEC1	HGNC:25222; Q96DZ1
5086	ERLIN1	HGNC:16947; O75477
5087	ERLIN2	HGNC:1356; O94905
5088	ERLN	HGNC:40032; P0DI80
5089	ERMAP	HGNC:15743; Q96PL5
5090	ERMARD	HGNC:21056; Q5T6L9
5091	ERMN	HGNC:29208; Q8TAM6
5092	ERMP1	HGNC:23703; Q7Z2K6
5093	ERN1	HGNC:3449; O75460
5094	ERN2	HGNC:16942; Q76MJ5
5095	ERO1A	HGNC:13280; Q96HE7
5096	ERO1B	HGNC:14355; Q86YB8
5097	ERP27	HGNC:26495; Q96DN0
5098	ERP29	HGNC:13799; P30040
5099	ERP44	HGNC:18311; Q9BS26
5100	ERRFI1	HGNC:18185; Q9UJM3
5101	ERV3-1	HGNC:3454; Q14264
5102	ERVFRD-1	HGNC:33823; P60508
5103	ERVMER34-1	HGNC:42970; Q9H9K5
5104	ERVV-1	HGNC:26501; B6SEH8
5105	ERVV-2	HGNC:39051; B6SEH9
5106	ERVW-1	HGNC:13525; Q9UQF0
5107	ESAM	HGNC:17474; Q96AP7
5108	ESCO1	HGNC:24645; Q5FWF5
5109	ESCO2	HGNC:27230; Q56NI9
5110	ESD	HGNC:3465; P10768
5111	ESF1	HGNC:15898; Q9H501
5112	ESM1	HGNC:3466; Q9NQ30
5113	ESPL1	HGNC:16856; Q14674
5114	ESPN	HGNC:13281; B1AK53
5115	ESPNL	HGNC:27937; Q6ZVH7
5116	ESR1	HGNC:3467; P03372
5117	ESR2	HGNC:3468; Q92731
5118	ESRP1	HGNC:25966; Q6NXG1
5119	ESRP2	HGNC:26152; Q9H6T0
5120	ESRRA	HGNC:3471; P11474
5121	ESRRB	HGNC:3473; O95718
5122	ESRRG	HGNC:3474; P62508
5123	ESS2	HGNC:16817; Q96DF8
5124	ESX1	HGNC:14865; Q8N693
5125	ESYT1	HGNC:29534; Q9BSJ8
5126	ESYT2	HGNC:22211; A0FGR8
5127	ESYT3	HGNC:24295; A0FGR9
5128	ETAA1	HGNC:24648; Q9NY74
5129	ETDA	HGNC:53449; Q3ZM63
5130	ETDB	HGNC:44269; P0DPP9
5131	ETDC	HGNC:53450; A0A1B0GVM5
5132	ETF1	HGNC:3477; P62495
5133	ETFA	HGNC:3481; P13804
5134	ETFB	HGNC:3482; P38117
5135	ETFBKMT	HGNC:28739; Q8IXQ9
5136	ETFDH	HGNC:3483; Q16134
5137	ETFRF1	HGNC:27052; Q6IPR1
5138	ETHE1	HGNC:23287; O95571
5139	ETNK1	HGNC:24649; Q9HBU6
5140	ETNK2	HGNC:25575; Q9NVF9
5141	ETNPPL	HGNC:14404; Q8TBG4
5142	ETS1	HGNC:3488; P14921
5143	ETS2	HGNC:3489; P15036
5144	ETV1	HGNC:3490; P50549
5145	ETV2	HGNC:3491; O00321
5146	ETV3	HGNC:3492; P41162
5147	ETV3L	HGNC:33834; Q6ZN32
5148	ETV4	HGNC:3493; P43268
5149	ETV5	HGNC:3494; P41161
5150	ETV6	HGNC:3495; P41212
5151	ETV7	HGNC:18160; Q9Y603
5152	EVA1A	HGNC:25816; Q9H8M9
5153	EVA1B	HGNC:25558; Q9NVM1
5154	EVA1C	HGNC:13239; P58658
5155	EVC	HGNC:3497; P57679
5156	EVC2	HGNC:19747; Q86UK5
5157	EVI2A	HGNC:3499; P22794
5158	EVI2B	HGNC:3500; P34910
5159	EVI5	HGNC:3501; O60447
5160	EVI5L	HGNC:30464; Q96CN4
5161	EVL	HGNC:20234; Q9UI08
5162	EVPL	HGNC:3503; Q92817
5163	EVPLL	HGNC:35236; A8MZ36
5164	EVX1	HGNC:3506; P49640
5165	EVX2	HGNC:3507; Q03828
5166	EWSR1	HGNC:3508; Q01844
5167	EXD1	HGNC:28507; Q8NHP7
5168	EXD2	HGNC:20217; Q9NVH0
5169	EXD3	HGNC:26023; Q8N9H8
5170	EXO1	HGNC:3511; Q9UQ84
5171	EXO5	HGNC:26115; Q9H790
5172	EXOC1	HGNC:30380; Q9NV70
5173	EXOC1L	HGNC:53433; A0A1B0GW35
5174	EXOC2	HGNC:24968; Q96KP1
5175	EXOC3	HGNC:30378; O60645
5176	EXOC3L1	HGNC:27540; Q86VI1
5177	EXOC3L2	HGNC:30162; Q2M3D2
5178	EXOC3L4	HGNC:20120; Q17RC7
5179	EXOC4	HGNC:30389; Q96A65
5180	EXOC5	HGNC:10696; O00471
5181	EXOC6	HGNC:23196; Q8TAG9
5182	EXOC6B	HGNC:17085; Q9Y2D4
5183	EXOC7	HGNC:23214; Q9UPT5
5184	EXOC8	HGNC:24659; Q8IYI6
5185	EXOG	HGNC:3347; Q9Y2C4
5186	EXOSC1	HGNC:17286; Q9Y3B2
5187	EXOSC2	HGNC:17097; Q13868
5188	EXOSC3	HGNC:17944; Q9NQT5
5189	EXOSC4	HGNC:18189; Q9NPD3
5190	EXOSC5	HGNC:24662; Q9NQT4
5191	EXOSC6	HGNC:19055; Q5RKV6
5192	EXOSC7	HGNC:28112; Q15024
5193	EXOSC8	HGNC:17035; Q96B26
5194	EXOSC9	HGNC:9137; Q06265
5195	EXOSC10	HGNC:9138; Q01780
5196	EXPH5	HGNC:30578; Q8NEV8
5197	EXT1	HGNC:3512; Q16394
5198	EXT2	HGNC:3513; Q93063
5199	EXTL1	HGNC:3515; Q92935
5200	EXTL2	HGNC:3516; Q9UBQ6
5201	EXTL3	HGNC:3518; O43909
5202	EYA1	HGNC:3519; Q99502
5203	EYA2	HGNC:3520; O00167
5204	EYA3	HGNC:3521; Q99504
5205	EYA4	HGNC:3522; O95677
5206	EYS	HGNC:21555; Q5T1H1
5207	EZH1	HGNC:3526; Q92800
5208	EZH2	HGNC:3527; Q15910
5209	EZHIP	HGNC:33738; Q86X51
5210	EZR	HGNC:12691; P15311
5211	F2	HGNC:3535; P00734
5212	F2R	HGNC:3537; P25116
5213	F2RL1	HGNC:3538; P55085
5214	F2RL2	HGNC:3539; O00254
5215	F2RL3	HGNC:3540; Q96RI0
5216	F3	HGNC:3541; P13726
5217	F5	HGNC:3542; P12259
5218	F7	HGNC:3544; P08709
5219	F8	HGNC:3546; P00451
5220	F8A1	HGNC:3547; P23610
5221	F8A2	HGNC:31849; P23610
5222	F8A3	HGNC:31850; P23610
5223	F9	HGNC:3551; P00740
5224	F10	HGNC:3528; P00742
5225	F11	HGNC:3529; P03951
5226	F11R	HGNC:14685; Q9Y624
5227	F12	HGNC:3530; P00748
5228	F13A1	HGNC:3531; P00488
5229	F13B	HGNC:3534; P05160
5230	FA2H	HGNC:21197; Q7L5A8
5231	FAAH	HGNC:3553; O00519
5232	FAAH2	HGNC:26440; Q6GMR7
5233	FAAP20	HGNC:26428; Q6NZ36
5234	FAAP24	HGNC:28467; Q9BTP7
5235	FAAP100	HGNC:26171; Q0VG06
5236	FABP1	HGNC:3555; P07148
5237	FABP2	HGNC:3556; P12104
5238	FABP3	HGNC:3557; P05413
5239	FABP4	HGNC:3559; P15090
5240	FABP5	HGNC:3560; Q01469
5241	FABP6	HGNC:3561; P51161
5242	FABP7	HGNC:3562; O15540
5243	FABP9	HGNC:3563; Q0Z7S8
5244	FABP12	HGNC:34524; A6NFH5
5245	FADD	HGNC:3573; Q13158
5246	FADS1	HGNC:3574; O60427
5247	FADS2	HGNC:3575; O95864
5248	FADS3	HGNC:3576; Q9Y5Q0
5249	FADS6	HGNC:30459; Q8N9I5
5250	FAF1	HGNC:3578; Q9UNN5
5251	FAF2	HGNC:24666; Q96CS3
5252	FAH	HGNC:3579; P16930
5253	FAHD1	HGNC:14169; Q6P587
5254	FAHD2A	HGNC:24252; Q96GK7
5255	FAHD2B	HGNC:25318; Q6P2I3
5256	FAIM	HGNC:18703; Q9NVQ4
5257	FAIM2	HGNC:17067; Q9BWQ8
5258	FAM3A	HGNC:13749; P98173
5259	FAM3B	HGNC:1253; P58499
5260	FAM3C	HGNC:18664; Q92520
5261	FAM3D	HGNC:18665; Q96BQ1
5262	FAM8A1	HGNC:16372; Q9UBU6
5263	FAM9A	HGNC:18403; Q8IZU1
5264	FAM9B	HGNC:18404; Q8IZU0
5265	FAM9C	HGNC:18405; Q8IZT9
5266	FAM13A	HGNC:19367; O94988
5267	FAM13B	HGNC:1335; Q9NYF5
5268	FAM13C	HGNC:19371; Q8NE31
5269	FAM20A	HGNC:23015; Q96MK3
5270	FAM20B	HGNC:23017; O75063
5271	FAM20C	HGNC:22140; Q8IXL6
5272	FAM24A	HGNC:23470; A6NFZ4
5273	FAM24B	HGNC:23475; Q8N5W8
5274	FAM25A	HGNC:23436; B3EWG3
5275	FAM25C	HGNC:23586; B3EWG5
5276	FAM25G	HGNC:23590; B3EWG6
5277	FAM32A	HGNC:24563; Q9Y421
5278	FAM43A	HGNC:26888; Q8N2R8
5279	FAM43B	HGNC:31791; Q6ZT52
5280	FAM47A	HGNC:29962; Q5JRC9
5281	FAM47B	HGNC:26659; Q8NA70
5282	FAM47C	HGNC:25301; Q5HY64
5283	FAM47E	HGNC:34343; Q6ZV65
5284	FAM50A	HGNC:18786; Q14320
5285	FAM50B	HGNC:18789; Q9Y247
5286	FAM53A	HGNC:31860; Q6NSI3
5287	FAM53B	HGNC:28968; Q14153
5288	FAM53C	HGNC:1336; Q9NYF3
5289	FAM72A	HGNC:24044; Q5TYM5
5290	FAM72B	HGNC:24805; Q86X60
5291	FAM72C	HGNC:30602; H0Y354
5292	FAM72D	HGNC:33593; Q6L9T8
5293	FAM76A	HGNC:28530; Q8TAV0
5294	FAM76B	HGNC:28492; Q5HYJ3
5295	FAM78A	HGNC:25465; Q5JUQ0
5296	FAM78B	HGNC:13495; Q5VT40
5297	FAM81A	HGNC:28379; Q8TBF8
5298	FAM81B	HGNC:26335; Q96LP2
5299	FAM83A	HGNC:28210; Q86UY5
5300	FAM83B	HGNC:21357; Q5T0W9
5301	FAM83C	HGNC:16121; Q9BQN1
5302	FAM83D	HGNC:16122; Q9H4H8
5303	FAM83E	HGNC:25972; Q2M2I3
5304	FAM83F	HGNC:25148; Q8NEG4
5305	FAM83G	HGNC:32554; A6ND36
5306	FAM83H	HGNC:24797; Q6ZRV2
5307	FAM86B1	HGNC:28268; Q8N7N1
5308	FAM86B2	HGNC:32222; P0C5J1
5309	FAM89A	HGNC:25057; Q96GI7
5310	FAM89B	HGNC:16708; Q8N5H3
5311	FAM90A1	HGNC:25526; Q86YD7
5312	FAM90A3	HGNC:32251; A0A8V8TPE2
5313	FAM90A5	HGNC:32253; A8MXJ8
5314	FAM90A7	HGNC:32255; A6NKC0
5315	FAM90A8	HGNC:32256; A6NJQ4
5316	FAM90A9	HGNC:32257; A6NNJ1
5317	FAM90A10	HGNC:32258; A6NDY2
5318	FAM90A11	HGNC:32259; A0A8V8TNH8
5319	FAM90A12	HGNC:32260; A8MX19
5320	FAM90A13	HGNC:32261; P0C7W8
5321	FAM90A14	HGNC:32262; P0C7W9
5322	FAM90A15	HGNC:32263; P0C7V4
5323	FAM90A16	HGNC:32264; P0DV73
5324	FAM90A17	HGNC:32265; P0DV74
5325	FAM90A18	HGNC:32266; P0DV75
5326	FAM90A19	HGNC:32267; P0DV76
5327	FAM90A20	HGNC:32268; A6NIJ5
5328	FAM90A22	HGNC:32270; A8MWA6
5329	FAM90A23	HGNC:32271; A8MXZ1
5330	FAM90A24	HGNC:32272; P0C7X0
5331	FAM90A26	HGNC:43746; D6RGX4
5332	FAM91A1	HGNC:26306; Q658Y4
5333	FAM98A	HGNC:24520; Q8NCA5
5334	FAM98B	HGNC:26773; Q52LJ0
5335	FAM98C	HGNC:27119; Q17RN3
5336	FAM107A	HGNC:30827; O95990
5337	FAM107B	HGNC:23726; Q9H098
5338	FAM110A	HGNC:16188; Q9BQ89
5339	FAM110B	HGNC:28587; Q8TC76
5340	FAM110C	HGNC:33340; Q1W6H9
5341	FAM110D	HGNC:25860; Q8TAY7
5342	FAM111A	HGNC:24725; Q96PZ2
5343	FAM111B	HGNC:24200; Q6SJ93
5344	FAM114A1	HGNC:25087; Q8IWE2
5345	FAM114A2	HGNC:1333; Q9NRY5
5346	FAM117A	HGNC:24179; Q9C073
5347	FAM117B	HGNC:14440; Q6P1L5
5348	FAM118A	HGNC:1313; Q9NWS6
5349	FAM118B	HGNC:26110; Q9BPY3
5350	FAM120A	HGNC:13247; Q9NZB2
5351	FAM120AOS	HGNC:23389; Q5T036
5352	FAM120B	HGNC:21109; Q96EK7
5353	FAM120C	HGNC:16949; Q9NX05
5354	FAM124A	HGNC:26413; Q86V42
5355	FAM124B	HGNC:26224; Q9H5Z6
5356	FAM131A	HGNC:28308; Q6UXB0
5357	FAM131B	HGNC:22202; Q86XD5
5358	FAM131C	HGNC:26717; Q96AQ9
5359	FAM133A	HGNC:26748; Q8N9E0
5360	FAM133B	HGNC:28629; Q5BKY9
5361	FAM135A	HGNC:21084; Q9P2D6
5362	FAM135B	HGNC:28029; Q49AJ0
5363	FAM136A	HGNC:25911; Q96C01
5364	FAM149A	HGNC:24527; A5PLN7
5365	FAM149B1	HGNC:29162; Q96BN6
5366	FAM151A	HGNC:25032; Q8WW52
5367	FAM151B	HGNC:33716; Q6UXP7
5368	FAM153A	HGNC:29940; Q9UHL3
5369	FAM153B	HGNC:27323; P0C7A2
5370	FAM156A	HGNC:30114; Q8NDB6
5371	FAM156B	HGNC:31962; Q8NDB6
5372	FAM161A	HGNC:25808; Q3B820
5373	FAM161B	HGNC:19854; Q96MY7
5374	FAM162A	HGNC:17865; Q96A26
5375	FAM162B	HGNC:21549; Q5T6X4
5376	FAM163A	HGNC:28274; Q96GL9
5377	FAM163B	HGNC:33277; P0C2L3
5378	FAM167A	HGNC:15549; Q96KS9
5379	FAM167B	HGNC:28133; Q9BTA0
5380	FAM168A	HGNC:28999; Q92567
5381	FAM168B	HGNC:27016; A1KXE4
5382	FAM169A	HGNC:29138; Q9Y6X4
5383	FAM170A	HGNC:27963; A1A519
5384	FAM170B	HGNC:19736; A6NMN3
5385	FAM171A1	HGNC:23522; Q5VUB5
5386	FAM171A2	HGNC:30480; A8MVW0
5387	FAM171B	HGNC:29412; Q6P995
5388	FAM174A	HGNC:24943; Q8TBP5
5389	FAM174B	HGNC:34339; Q3ZCQ3
5390	FAM174C	HGNC:26073; Q9BVV8
5391	FAM177A1	HGNC:19829; Q8N128
5392	FAM177B	HGNC:34395; A6PVY3
5393	FAM178B	HGNC:28036; Q8IXR5
5394	FAM180A	HGNC:33773; Q6UWF9
5395	FAM180B	HGNC:34451; Q6P0A1
5396	FAM181A	HGNC:20491; Q8N9Y4
5397	FAM181B	HGNC:28512; A6NEQ2
5398	FAM184A	HGNC:20991; Q8NB25
5399	FAM184B	HGNC:29235; Q9ULE4
5400	FAM185A	HGNC:22412; Q8N0U4
5401	FAM186A	HGNC:26980; A6NE01
5402	FAM186B	HGNC:25296; Q8IYM0
5403	FAM187A	HGNC:35153; A6NFU0
5404	FAM187B	HGNC:26366; Q17R55
5405	FAM193A	HGNC:16822; P78312
5406	FAM193B	HGNC:25524; Q96PV7
5407	FAM199X	HGNC:25195; Q6PEV8
5408	FAM200A	HGNC:25401; Q8TCP9
5409	FAM200B	HGNC:27740; P0CF97
5410	FAM200C	HGNC:30804; Q8IZ13
5411	FAM204A	HGNC:25794; Q9H8W3
5412	FAM209A	HGNC:16100; Q5JX71
5413	FAM209B	HGNC:16101; Q5JX69
5414	FAM210A	HGNC:28346; Q96ND0
5415	FAM210B	HGNC:16102; Q96KR6
5416	FAM216A	HGNC:30180; Q8WUB2
5417	FAM216B	HGNC:26883; Q8N7L0
5418	FAM217A	HGNC:21362; Q8IXS0
5419	FAM217B	HGNC:16170; Q9NTX9
5420	FAM219A	HGNC:19920; Q8IW50
5421	FAM219B	HGNC:24695; Q5XKK7
5422	FAM220A	HGNC:22422; Q7Z4H9
5423	FAM221A	HGNC:27977; A4D161
5424	FAM221B	HGNC:30762; A6H8Z2
5425	FAM222A	HGNC:25915; Q5U5X8
5426	FAM222B	HGNC:25563; Q8WU58
5427	FAM227A	HGNC:44197; F5H4B4
5428	FAM227B	HGNC:26543; Q96M60
5429	FAM228A	HGNC:34418; Q86W67
5430	FAM228B	HGNC:24736; P0C875
5431	FAM229A	HGNC:44652; H3BQW9
5432	FAM229B	HGNC:33858; Q4G0N7
5433	FAM234A	HGNC:14163; Q9H0X4
5434	FAM234B	HGNC:29288; A2RU67
5435	FAM236A	HGNC:44268; A0A1B0GUQ0
5436	FAM236B	HGNC:52640; A0A1B0GV22
5437	FAM236C	HGNC:52641; P0DP71
5438	FAM236D	HGNC:52642; A0A1B0GTK5
5439	FAM237A	HGNC:52388; A0A1B0GTK4
5440	FAM237B	HGNC:53217; A0A1B0GVD1
5441	FAM240A	HGNC:52390; A0A1B0GVK7
5442	FAM240B	HGNC:53430; A0A1B0GVZ2
5443	FAM240C	HGNC:54200; A0A1B0GVR7
5444	FAM241A	HGNC:26813; Q8N8J7
5445	FAM241B	HGNC:23519; Q96D05
5446	FAM246A	HGNC:54844; A0A494C0Y3
5447	FAM246B	HGNC:54843; A0A494C0N9
5448	FAM246C	HGNC:54842; P0DSO1
5449	FAN1	HGNC:29170; Q9Y2M0
5450	FANCA	HGNC:3582; O15360
5451	FANCB	HGNC:3583; Q8NB91
5452	FANCC	HGNC:3584; Q00597
5453	FANCD2	HGNC:3585; Q9BXW9
5454	FANCD2OS	HGNC:28623; Q96PS1
5455	FANCE	HGNC:3586; Q9HB96
5456	FANCF	HGNC:3587; Q9NPI8
5457	FANCG	HGNC:3588; O15287
5458	FANCI	HGNC:25568; Q9NVI1
5459	FANCL	HGNC:20748; Q9NW38
5460	FANCM	HGNC:23168; Q8IYD8
5461	FANK1	HGNC:23527; Q8TC84
5462	FAP	HGNC:3590; Q12884
5463	FAR1	HGNC:26222; Q8WVX9
5464	FAR2	HGNC:25531; Q96K12
5465	FARP1	HGNC:3591; Q9Y4F1
5466	FARP2	HGNC:16460; O94887
5467	FARS2	HGNC:21062; O95363
5468	FARSA	HGNC:3592; Q9Y285
5469	FARSB	HGNC:17800; Q9NSD9
5470	FAS	HGNC:11920; P25445
5471	FASLG	HGNC:11936; P48023
5472	FASN	HGNC:3594; P49327
5473	FASTK	HGNC:24676; Q14296
5474	FASTKD1	HGNC:26150; Q53R41
5475	FASTKD2	HGNC:29160; Q9NYY8
5476	FASTKD3	HGNC:28758; Q14CZ7
5477	FASTKD5	HGNC:25790; Q7L8L6
5478	FAT1	HGNC:3595; Q14517
5479	FAT2	HGNC:3596; Q9NYQ8
5480	FAT3	HGNC:23112; Q8TDW7
5481	FAT4	HGNC:23109; Q6V0I7
5482	FATE1	HGNC:24683; Q969F0
5483	FAU	HGNC:3597; P62861
5484	FAXC	HGNC:20742; Q5TGI0
5485	FAXDC2	HGNC:1334; Q96IV6
5486	FBF1	HGNC:24674; Q8TES7
5487	FBH1	HGNC:13620; Q8NFZ0
5488	FBL	HGNC:3599; P22087
5489	FBLIM1	HGNC:24686; Q8WUP2
5490	FBLL1	HGNC:35458; A6NHQ2
5491	FBLN1	HGNC:3600; P23142
5492	FBLN2	HGNC:3601; P98095
5493	FBLN5	HGNC:3602; Q9UBX5
5494	FBLN7	HGNC:26740; Q53RD9
5495	FBN1	HGNC:3603; P35555
5496	FBN2	HGNC:3604; P35556
5497	FBN3	HGNC:18794; Q75N90
5498	FBP1	HGNC:3606; P09467
5499	FBP2	HGNC:3607; O00757
5500	FBRS	HGNC:20442; Q9HAH7
5501	FBRSL1	HGNC:29308; Q9HCM7
5502	FBXL2	HGNC:13598; Q9UKC9
5503	FBXL3	HGNC:13599; Q9UKT7
5504	FBXL4	HGNC:13601; Q9UKA2
5505	FBXL5	HGNC:13602; Q9UKA1
5506	FBXL6	HGNC:13603; Q8N531
5507	FBXL7	HGNC:13604; Q9UJT9
5508	FBXL8	HGNC:17875; Q96CD0
5509	FBXL12	HGNC:13611; Q9NXK8
5510	FBXL13	HGNC:21658; Q8NEE6
5511	FBXL14	HGNC:28624; Q8N1E6
5512	FBXL15	HGNC:28155; Q9H469
5513	FBXL16	HGNC:14150; Q8N461
5514	FBXL17	HGNC:13615; Q9UF56
5515	FBXL18	HGNC:21874; Q96ME1
5516	FBXL19	HGNC:25300; Q6PCT2
5517	FBXL20	HGNC:24679; Q96IG2
5518	FBXL22	HGNC:27537; Q6P050
5519	FBXO2	HGNC:13581; Q9UK22
5520	FBXO3	HGNC:13582; Q9UK99
5521	FBXO4	HGNC:13583; Q9UKT5
5522	FBXO5	HGNC:13584; Q9UKT4
5523	FBXO6	HGNC:13585; Q9NRD1
5524	FBXO7	HGNC:13586; Q9Y3I1
5525	FBXO8	HGNC:13587; Q9NRD0
5526	FBXO9	HGNC:13588; Q9UK97
5527	FBXO10	HGNC:13589; Q9UK96
5528	FBXO11	HGNC:13590; Q86XK2
5529	FBXO15	HGNC:13617; Q8NCQ5
5530	FBXO16	HGNC:13618; Q8IX29
5531	FBXO17	HGNC:18754; Q96EF6
5532	FBXO21	HGNC:13592; O94952
5533	FBXO22	HGNC:13593; Q8NEZ5
5534	FBXO24	HGNC:13595; O75426
5535	FBXO25	HGNC:13596; Q8TCJ0
5536	FBXO27	HGNC:18753; Q8NI29
5537	FBXO28	HGNC:29046; Q9NVF7
5538	FBXO30	HGNC:15600; Q8TB52
5539	FBXO31	HGNC:16510; Q5XUX0
5540	FBXO32	HGNC:16731; Q969P5
5541	FBXO33	HGNC:19833; Q7Z6M2
5542	FBXO34	HGNC:20201; Q9NWN3
5543	FBXO36	HGNC:27020; Q8NEA4
5544	FBXO38	HGNC:28844; Q6PIJ6
5545	FBXO39	HGNC:28565; Q8N4B4
5546	FBXO40	HGNC:29816; Q9UH90
5547	FBXO41	HGNC:29409; Q8TF61
5548	FBXO42	HGNC:29249; Q6P3S6
5549	FBXO43	HGNC:28521; Q4G163
5550	FBXO44	HGNC:24847; Q9H4M3
5551	FBXO45	HGNC:29148; P0C2W1
5552	FBXO46	HGNC:25069; Q6PJ61
5553	FBXO47	HGNC:31969; Q5MNV8
5554	FBXO48	HGNC:33857; Q5FWF7
5555	FBXW2	HGNC:13608; Q9UKT8
5556	FBXW4	HGNC:10847; P57775
5557	FBXW5	HGNC:13613; Q969U6
5558	FBXW7	HGNC:16712; Q969H0
5559	FBXW8	HGNC:13597; Q8N3Y1
5560	FBXW9	HGNC:28136; Q5XUX1
5561	FBXW10	HGNC:1211; Q5XX13
5562	FBXW10B	HGNC:14379; O95170
5563	FBXW11	HGNC:13607; Q9UKB1
5564	FBXW12	HGNC:20729; Q6X9E4
5565	FCAMR	HGNC:24692; Q8WWV6
5566	FCAR	HGNC:3608; P24071
5567	FCER1A	HGNC:3609; P12319
5568	FCER1G	HGNC:3611; P30273
5569	FCER2	HGNC:3612; P06734
5570	FCF1	HGNC:20220; Q9Y324
5571	FCGBP	HGNC:13572; Q9Y6R7
5572	FCGR1A	HGNC:3613; P12314
5573	FCGR2A	HGNC:3616; P12318
5574	FCGR2B	HGNC:3618; P31994
5575	FCGR2C	HGNC:15626; P31995
5576	FCGR3A	HGNC:3619; P08637
5577	FCGR3B	HGNC:3620; O75015
5578	FCGRT	HGNC:3621; P55899
5579	FCHO1	HGNC:29002; O14526
5580	FCHO2	HGNC:25180; Q0JRZ9
5581	FCHSD1	HGNC:25463; Q86WN1
5582	FCHSD2	HGNC:29114; O94868
5583	FCMR	HGNC:14315; O60667
5584	FCN1	HGNC:3623; O00602
5585	FCN2	HGNC:3624; Q15485
5586	FCN3	HGNC:3625; O75636
5587	FCRL1	HGNC:18509; Q96LA6
5588	FCRL2	HGNC:14875; Q96LA5
5589	FCRL3	HGNC:18506; Q96P31
5590	FCRL4	HGNC:18507; Q96PJ5
5591	FCRL5	HGNC:18508; Q96RD9
5592	FCRL6	HGNC:31910; Q6DN72
5593	FCRLA	HGNC:18504; Q7L513
5594	FCRLB	HGNC:26431; Q6BAA4
5595	FCSK	HGNC:29500; Q8N0W3
5596	FDCSP	HGNC:19215; Q8NFU4
5597	FDFT1	HGNC:3629; P37268
5598	FDPS	HGNC:3631; P14324
5599	FDX1	HGNC:3638; P10109
5600	FDX2	HGNC:30546; Q6P4F2
5601	FDXACB1	HGNC:25110; Q9BRP7
5602	FDXR	HGNC:3642; P22570
5603	FECH	HGNC:3647; P22830
5604	FEM1A	HGNC:16934; Q9BSK4
5605	FEM1B	HGNC:3649; Q9UK73
5606	FEM1C	HGNC:16933; Q96JP0
5607	FEN1	HGNC:3650; P39748
5608	FER	HGNC:3655; P16591
5609	FER1L5	HGNC:19044; A0AVI2
5610	FER1L6	HGNC:28065; Q2WGJ9
5611	FERD3L	HGNC:16660; Q96RJ6
5612	FERMT1	HGNC:15889; Q9BQL6
5613	FERMT2	HGNC:15767; Q96AC1
5614	FERMT3	HGNC:23151; Q86UX7
5615	FERRY3	HGNC:1184; Q9NQ89
5616	FES	HGNC:3657; P07332
5617	FETUB	HGNC:3658; Q9UGM5
5618	FEV	HGNC:18562; Q99581
5619	FEZ1	HGNC:3659; Q99689
5620	FEZ2	HGNC:3660; Q9UHY8
5621	FEZF1	HGNC:22788; A0PJY2
5622	FEZF2	HGNC:13506; Q8TBJ5
5623	FFAR1	HGNC:4498; O14842
5624	FFAR2	HGNC:4501; O15552
5625	FFAR3	HGNC:4499; O14843
5626	FFAR4	HGNC:19061; Q5NUL3
5627	FGA	HGNC:3661; P02671
5628	FGB	HGNC:3662; P02675
5629	FGD1	HGNC:3663; P98174
5630	FGD2	HGNC:3664; Q7Z6J4
5631	FGD3	HGNC:16027; Q5JSP0
5632	FGD4	HGNC:19125; Q96M96
5633	FGD5	HGNC:19117; Q6ZNL6
5634	FGD6	HGNC:21740; Q6ZV73
5635	FGF1	HGNC:3665; P05230
5636	FGF2	HGNC:3676; P09038
5637	FGF3	HGNC:3681; P11487
5638	FGF4	HGNC:3682; P08620
5639	FGF5	HGNC:3683; P12034
5640	FGF6	HGNC:3684; P10767
5641	FGF7	HGNC:3685; P21781
5642	FGF8	HGNC:3686; P55075
5643	FGF9	HGNC:3687; P31371
5644	FGF10	HGNC:3666; O15520
5645	FGF11	HGNC:3667; Q92914
5646	FGF12	HGNC:3668; P61328
5647	FGF13	HGNC:3670; Q92913
5648	FGF14	HGNC:3671; Q92915
5649	FGF16	HGNC:3672; O43320
5650	FGF17	HGNC:3673; O60258
5651	FGF18	HGNC:3674; O76093
5652	FGF19	HGNC:3675; O95750
5653	FGF20	HGNC:3677; Q9NP95
5654	FGF21	HGNC:3678; Q9NSA1
5655	FGF22	HGNC:3679; Q9HCT0
5656	FGF23	HGNC:3680; Q9GZV9
5657	FGFBP1	HGNC:19695; Q14512
5658	FGFBP2	HGNC:29451; Q9BYJ0
5659	FGFBP3	HGNC:23428; Q8TAT2
5660	FGFR1	HGNC:3688; P11362
5661	FGFR1OP2	HGNC:23098; Q9NVK5
5662	FGFR2	HGNC:3689; P21802
5663	FGFR3	HGNC:3690; P22607
5664	FGFR4	HGNC:3691; P22455
5665	FGFRL1	HGNC:3693; Q8N441
5666	FGG	HGNC:3694; P02679
5667	FGGY	HGNC:25610; Q96C11
5668	FGL1	HGNC:3695; Q08830
5669	FGL2	HGNC:3696; Q14314
5670	FGR	HGNC:3697; P09769
5671	FH	HGNC:3700; P07954
5672	FHAD1	HGNC:29408; B1AJZ9
5673	FHDC1	HGNC:29363; Q9C0D6
5674	FHIP1A	HGNC:34237; Q05DH4
5675	FHIP1B	HGNC:25378; Q8N612
5676	FHIP2A	HGNC:29320; Q5W0V3
5677	FHIP2B	HGNC:16492; Q86V87
5678	FHIT	HGNC:3701; P49789
5679	FHL1	HGNC:3702; Q13642
5680	FHL2	HGNC:3703; Q14192
5681	FHL3	HGNC:3704; Q13643
5682	FHL5	HGNC:17371; Q5TD97
5683	FHOD1	HGNC:17905; Q9Y613
5684	FHOD3	HGNC:26178; Q2V2M9
5685	FIBCD1	HGNC:25922; Q8N539
5686	FIBIN	HGNC:33747; Q8TAL6
5687	FIBP	HGNC:3705; O43427
5688	FICD	HGNC:18416; Q9BVA6
5689	FIG4	HGNC:16873; Q92562
5690	FIGLA	HGNC:24669; Q6QHK4
5691	FIGN	HGNC:13285; Q5HY92
5692	FIGNL1	HGNC:13286; Q6PIW4
5693	FIGNL2	HGNC:13287; A6NMB9
5694	FILIP1	HGNC:21015; Q7Z7B0
5695	FILIP1L	HGNC:24589; Q4L180
5696	FIP1L1	HGNC:19124; Q6UN15
5697	FIRRM	HGNC:25565; Q9NSG2
5698	FIS1	HGNC:21689; Q9Y3D6
5699	FITM1	HGNC:33714; A5D6W6
5700	FITM2	HGNC:16135; Q8N6M3
5701	FIZ1	HGNC:25917; Q96SL8
5702	FJX1	HGNC:17166; Q86VR8
5703	FKBP1A	HGNC:3711; P62942
5704	FKBP1B	HGNC:3712; P68106
5705	FKBP1C	HGNC:21376; Q5VVH2
5706	FKBP2	HGNC:3718; P26885
5707	FKBP3	HGNC:3719; Q00688
5708	FKBP4	HGNC:3720; Q02790
5709	FKBP5	HGNC:3721; Q13451
5710	FKBP6	HGNC:3722; O75344
5711	FKBP7	HGNC:3723; Q9Y680
5712	FKBP8	HGNC:3724; Q14318
5713	FKBP9	HGNC:3725; O95302
5714	FKBP10	HGNC:18169; Q96AY3
5715	FKBP11	HGNC:18624; Q9NYL4
5716	FKBP14	HGNC:18625; Q9NWM8
5717	FKBP15	HGNC:23397; Q5T1M5
5718	FKBPL	HGNC:13949; Q9UIM3
5719	FKRP	HGNC:17997; Q9H9S5
5720	FKTN	HGNC:3622; O75072
5721	FLACC1	HGNC:14439; Q96Q35
5722	FLAD1	HGNC:24671; Q8NFF5
5723	FLCN	HGNC:27310; Q8NFG4
5724	FLG	HGNC:3748; P20930
5725	FLG2	HGNC:33276; Q5D862
5726	FLI1	HGNC:3749; Q01543
5727	FLII	HGNC:3750; Q13045
5728	FLNA	HGNC:3754; P21333
5729	FLNB	HGNC:3755; O75369
5730	FLNC	HGNC:3756; Q14315
5731	FLOT1	HGNC:3757; O75955
5732	FLOT2	HGNC:3758; Q14254
5733	FLRT1	HGNC:3760; Q9NZU1
5734	FLRT2	HGNC:3761; O43155
5735	FLRT3	HGNC:3762; Q9NZU0
5736	FLT1	HGNC:3763; P17948
5737	FLT3	HGNC:3765; P36888
5738	FLT3LG	HGNC:3766; P49771
5739	FLT4	HGNC:3767; P35916
5740	FLVCR1	HGNC:24682; Q9Y5Y0
5741	FLVCR2	HGNC:20105; Q9UPI3
5742	FLYWCH1	HGNC:25404; Q4VC44
5743	FLYWCH2	HGNC:25178; Q96CP2
5744	FMC1	HGNC:26946; Q96HJ9
5745	FMN1	HGNC:3768; Q68DA7
5746	FMN2	HGNC:14074; Q9NZ56
5747	FMNL1	HGNC:1212; O95466
5748	FMNL2	HGNC:18267; Q96PY5
5749	FMNL3	HGNC:23698; Q8IVF7
5750	FMO1	HGNC:3769; Q01740
5751	FMO2	HGNC:3770; Q99518
5752	FMO3	HGNC:3771; P31513
5753	FMO4	HGNC:3772; P31512
5754	FMO5	HGNC:3773; P49326
5755	FMOD	HGNC:3774; Q06828
5756	FMR1	HGNC:3775; Q06787
5757	FMR1NB	HGNC:26372; Q8N0W7
5758	FN1	HGNC:3778; P02751
5759	FN3K	HGNC:24822; Q9H479
5760	FN3KRP	HGNC:25700; Q9HA64
5761	FNBP1	HGNC:17069; Q96RU3
5762	FNBP1L	HGNC:20851; Q5T0N5
5763	FNBP4	HGNC:19752; Q8N3X1
5764	FNDC1	HGNC:21184; Q4ZHG4
5765	FNDC3A	HGNC:20296; Q9Y2H6
5766	FNDC3B	HGNC:24670; Q53EP0
5767	FNDC4	HGNC:20239; Q9H6D8
5768	FNDC5	HGNC:20240; Q8NAU1
5769	FNDC7	HGNC:26668; Q5VTL7
5770	FNDC8	HGNC:25286; Q8TC99
5771	FNDC9	HGNC:33547; Q8TBE3
5772	FNDC10	HGNC:42951; F2Z333
5773	FNDC11	HGNC:28764; Q9BVV2
5774	FNIP1	HGNC:29418; Q8TF40
5775	FNIP2	HGNC:29280; Q9P278
5776	FNTA	HGNC:3782; P49354
5777	FNTB	HGNC:3785; P49356
5778	FOCAD	HGNC:23377; Q5VW36
5779	FOLH1	HGNC:3788; Q04609
5780	FOLR1	HGNC:3791; P15328
5781	FOLR2	HGNC:3793; P14207
5782	FOLR3	HGNC:3795; P41439
5783	FOS	HGNC:3796; P01100
5784	FOSB	HGNC:3797; P53539
5785	FOSL1	HGNC:13718; P15407
5786	FOSL2	HGNC:3798; P15408
5787	FOXA1	HGNC:5021; P55317
5788	FOXA2	HGNC:5022; Q9Y261
5789	FOXA3	HGNC:5023; P55318
5790	FOXB1	HGNC:3799; Q99853
5791	FOXB2	HGNC:23315; Q5VYV0
5792	FOXC1	HGNC:3800; Q12948
5793	FOXC2	HGNC:3801; Q99958
5794	FOXD1	HGNC:3802; Q16676
5795	FOXD2	HGNC:3803; O60548
5796	FOXD3	HGNC:3804; Q9UJU5
5797	FOXD4	HGNC:3805; Q12950
5798	FOXD4L1	HGNC:18521; Q9NU39
5799	FOXD4L3	HGNC:18523; Q6VB84
5800	FOXD4L4	HGNC:23762; Q8WXT5
5801	FOXD4L5	HGNC:18522; Q5VV16
5802	FOXD4L6	HGNC:31986; Q3SYB3
5803	FOXE1	HGNC:3806; O00358
5804	FOXE3	HGNC:3808; Q13461
5805	FOXF1	HGNC:3809; Q12946
5806	FOXF2	HGNC:3810; Q12947
5807	FOXG1	HGNC:3811; P55316
5808	FOXH1	HGNC:3814; O75593
5809	FOXI1	HGNC:3815; Q12951
5810	FOXI2	HGNC:32448; Q6ZQN5
5811	FOXI3	HGNC:35123; A8MTJ6
5812	FOXJ1	HGNC:3816; Q92949
5813	FOXJ2	HGNC:24818; Q9P0K8
5814	FOXJ3	HGNC:29178; Q9UPW0
5815	FOXK1	HGNC:23480; P85037
5816	FOXK2	HGNC:6036; Q01167
5817	FOXL1	HGNC:3817; Q12952
5818	FOXL2	HGNC:1092; P58012
5819	FOXL2NB	HGNC:34428; Q6ZUU3
5820	FOXL3	HGNC:54201; A0A1W2PRP0
5821	FOXM1	HGNC:3818; Q08050
5822	FOXN1	HGNC:12765; O15353
5823	FOXN2	HGNC:5281; P32314
5824	FOXN3	HGNC:1928; O00409
5825	FOXN4	HGNC:21399; Q96NZ1
5826	FOXO1	HGNC:3819; Q12778
5827	FOXO3	HGNC:3821; O43524
5828	FOXO3B	HGNC:3822; A0A2Z4LIS9
5829	FOXO4	HGNC:7139; P98177
5830	FOXO6	HGNC:24814; A8MYZ6
5831	FOXP1	HGNC:3823; Q9H334
5832	FOXP2	HGNC:13875; O15409
5833	FOXP3	HGNC:6106; Q9BZS1
5834	FOXP4	HGNC:20842; Q8IVH2
5835	FOXQ1	HGNC:20951; Q9C009
5836	FOXR1	HGNC:29980; Q6PIV2
5837	FOXR2	HGNC:30469; Q6PJQ5
5838	FOXRED1	HGNC:26927; Q96CU9
5839	FOXRED2	HGNC:26264; Q8IWF2
5840	FOXS1	HGNC:3735; O43638
5841	FPGS	HGNC:3824; Q05932
5842	FPGT	HGNC:3825; O14772
5843	FPR1	HGNC:3826; P21462
5844	FPR2	HGNC:3827; P25090
5845	FPR3	HGNC:3828; P25089
5846	FRA10AC1	HGNC:1162; Q70Z53
5847	FRAS1	HGNC:19185; Q86XX4
5848	FRAT1	HGNC:3944; Q92837
5849	FRAT2	HGNC:16048; O75474
5850	FREM1	HGNC:23399; Q5H8C1
5851	FREM2	HGNC:25396; Q5SZK8
5852	FREM3	HGNC:25172; P0C091
5853	FREY1	HGNC:37213; C9JXX5
5854	FRG1	HGNC:3954; Q14331
5855	FRG2	HGNC:19136; Q64ET8
5856	FRG2B	HGNC:33518; Q96QU4
5857	FRG2C	HGNC:33626; A6NGY1
5858	FRK	HGNC:3955; P42685
5859	FRMD1	HGNC:21240; Q8N878
5860	FRMD3	HGNC:24125; A2A2Y4
5861	FRMD4A	HGNC:25491; Q9P2Q2
5862	FRMD4B	HGNC:24886; Q9Y2L6
5863	FRMD5	HGNC:28214; Q7Z6J6
5864	FRMD6	HGNC:19839; Q96NE9
5865	FRMD7	HGNC:8079; Q6ZUT3
5866	FRMD8	HGNC:25462; Q9BZ67
5867	FRMPD1	HGNC:29159; Q5SYB0
5868	FRMPD2	HGNC:28572; Q68DX3
5869	FRMPD3	HGNC:29382; Q5JV73
5870	FRMPD4	HGNC:29007; Q14CM0
5871	FRRS1	HGNC:27622; Q6ZNA5
5872	FRRS1L	HGNC:1362; Q9P0K9
5873	FRS2	HGNC:16971; Q8WU20
5874	FRS3	HGNC:16970; O43559
5875	FRY	HGNC:20367; Q5TBA9
5876	FRYL	HGNC:29127; O94915
5877	FRZB	HGNC:3959; Q92765
5878	FSAF1	HGNC:25332; Q8NDD1
5879	FSBP	HGNC:43653; O95073
5880	FSCB	HGNC:20494; Q5H9T9
5881	FSCN1	HGNC:11148; Q16658
5882	FSCN2	HGNC:3960; O14926
5883	FSCN3	HGNC:3961; Q9NQT6
5884	FSD1	HGNC:13745; Q9BTV5
5885	FSD1L	HGNC:13753; Q9BXM9
5886	FSD2	HGNC:18024; A1L4K1
5887	FSHB	HGNC:3964; P01225
5888	FSHR	HGNC:3969; P23945
5889	FSIP1	HGNC:21674; Q8NA03
5890	FSIP2	HGNC:21675; Q5CZC0
5891	FST	HGNC:3971; P19883
5892	FSTL1	HGNC:3972; Q12841
5893	FSTL3	HGNC:3973; O95633
5894	FSTL4	HGNC:21389; Q6MZW2
5895	FSTL5	HGNC:21386; Q8N475
5896	FTCD	HGNC:3974; O95954
5897	FTCDNL1	HGNC:48661; E5RQL4
5898	FTH1	HGNC:3976; P02794
5899	FTHL17	HGNC:3987; Q9BXU8
5900	FTL	HGNC:3999; P02792
5901	FTMT	HGNC:17345; Q8N4E7
5902	FTO	HGNC:24678; Q9C0B1
5903	FTSJ1	HGNC:13254; Q9UET6
5904	FTSJ3	HGNC:17136; Q8IY81
5905	FUBP1	HGNC:4004; Q96AE4
5906	FUBP3	HGNC:4005; Q96I24
5907	FUCA1	HGNC:4006; P04066
5908	FUCA2	HGNC:4008; Q9BTY2
5909	FUNDC1	HGNC:28746; Q8IVP5
5910	FUNDC2	HGNC:24925; Q9BWH2
5911	FUOM	HGNC:24733; A2VDF0
5912	FURIN	HGNC:8568; P09958
5913	FUS	HGNC:4010; P35637
5914	FUT1	HGNC:4012; P19526
5915	FUT2	HGNC:4013; Q10981
5916	FUT3	HGNC:4014; P21217
5917	FUT4	HGNC:4015; P22083
5918	FUT5	HGNC:4016; Q11128
5919	FUT6	HGNC:4017; P51993
5920	FUT7	HGNC:4018; Q11130
5921	FUT8	HGNC:4019; Q9BYC5
5922	FUT9	HGNC:4020; Q9Y231
5923	FUZ	HGNC:26219; Q9BT04
5924	FXN	HGNC:3951; Q16595
5925	FXR1	HGNC:4023; P51114
5926	FXR2	HGNC:4024; P51116
5927	FXYD1	HGNC:4025; O00168
5928	FXYD2	HGNC:4026; P54710
5929	FXYD3	HGNC:4027; Q14802
5930	FXYD4	HGNC:4028; P59646
5931	FXYD5	HGNC:4029; Q96DB9
5932	FXYD6	HGNC:4030; Q9H0Q3
5933	FXYD7	HGNC:4034; P58549
5934	FYB1	HGNC:4036; O15117
5935	FYB2	HGNC:27295; Q5VWT5
5936	FYCO1	HGNC:14673; Q9BQS8
5937	FYN	HGNC:4037; P06241
5938	FYTTD1	HGNC:25407; Q96QD9
5939	FZD1	HGNC:4038; Q9UP38
5940	FZD2	HGNC:4040; Q14332
5941	FZD3	HGNC:4041; Q9NPG1
5942	FZD4	HGNC:4042; Q9ULV1
5943	FZD5	HGNC:4043; Q13467
5944	FZD6	HGNC:4044; O60353
5945	FZD7	HGNC:4045; O75084
5946	FZD8	HGNC:4046; Q9H461
5947	FZD9	HGNC:4047; O00144
5948	FZD10	HGNC:4039; Q9ULW2
5949	FZR1	HGNC:24824; Q9UM11
5950	G0S2	HGNC:30229; P27469
5951	G2E3	HGNC:20338; Q7L622
5952	G3BP1	HGNC:30292; Q13283
5953	G3BP2	HGNC:30291; Q9UN86
5954	G6PC1	HGNC:4056; P35575
5955	G6PC2	HGNC:28906; Q9NQR9
5956	G6PC3	HGNC:24861; Q9BUM1
5957	G6PD	HGNC:4057; P11413
5958	GAA	HGNC:4065; P10253
5959	GAB1	HGNC:4066; Q13480
5960	GAB2	HGNC:14458; Q9UQC2
5961	GAB3	HGNC:17515; Q8WWW8
5962	GAB4	HGNC:18325; Q2WGN9
5963	GABARAP	HGNC:4067; O95166
5964	GABARAPL1	HGNC:4068; Q9H0R8
5965	GABARAPL2	HGNC:13291; P60520
5966	GABBR1	HGNC:4070; Q9UBS5
5967	GABBR2	HGNC:4507; O75899
5968	GABPA	HGNC:4071; Q06546
5969	GABPB1	HGNC:4074; Q06547
5970	GABPB2	HGNC:28441; Q8TAK5
5971	GABRA1	HGNC:4075; P14867
5972	GABRA2	HGNC:4076; P47869
5973	GABRA3	HGNC:4077; P34903
5974	GABRA4	HGNC:4078; P48169
5975	GABRA5	HGNC:4079; P31644
5976	GABRA6	HGNC:4080; Q16445
5977	GABRB1	HGNC:4081; P18505
5978	GABRB2	HGNC:4082; P47870
5979	GABRB3	HGNC:4083; P28472
5980	GABRD	HGNC:4084; O14764
5981	GABRE	HGNC:4085; P78334
5982	GABRG1	HGNC:4086; Q8N1C3
5983	GABRG2	HGNC:4087; P18507
5984	GABRG3	HGNC:4088; Q99928
5985	GABRP	HGNC:4089; O00591
5986	GABRQ	HGNC:14454; Q9UN88
5987	GABRR1	HGNC:4090; P24046
5988	GABRR2	HGNC:4091; P28476
5989	GABRR3	HGNC:17969; A8MPY1
5990	GAD1	HGNC:4092; Q99259
5991	GAD2	HGNC:4093; Q05329
5992	GADD45A	HGNC:4095; P24522
5993	GADD45B	HGNC:4096; O75293
5994	GADD45G	HGNC:4097; O95257
5995	GADD45GIP1	HGNC:29996; Q8TAE8
5996	GADL1	HGNC:27949; Q6ZQY3
5997	GAGE1	HGNC:4098; P0DTW1
5998	GAGE2A	HGNC:4099; Q6NT46
5999	GAGE2B	HGNC:31957; Q13066
6000	GAGE2C	HGNC:31958; Q13066
6001	GAGE2D	HGNC:31959; Q9UEU5
6002	GAGE2E	HGNC:31960; Q4V326
6003	GAGE4	HGNC:4101; P0DSO3
6004	GAGE5	HGNC:4102; Q13069
6005	GAGE6	HGNC:4103; Q13070
6006	GAGE7	HGNC:4104; O76087
6007	GAGE8	HGNC:4106; Q9UEU5
6008	GAGE10	HGNC:30968; A6NGK3
6009	GAGE12B	HGNC:26779; A1L429
6010	GAGE12C	HGNC:28402; A1L429
6011	GAGE12D	HGNC:31904; A1L429
6012	GAGE12E	HGNC:31905; A1L429
6013	GAGE12F	HGNC:31906; P0CL80
6014	GAGE12G	HGNC:31907; P0CL81
6015	GAGE12H	HGNC:31908; A6NDE8
6016	GAGE12I	HGNC:4105; P0CL82
6017	GAGE12J	HGNC:17778; A6NER3
6018	GAGE13	HGNC:29081; Q4V321
6019	GAK	HGNC:4113; O14976
6020	GAL	HGNC:4114; P22466
6021	GAL3ST1	HGNC:24240; Q99999
6022	GAL3ST2	HGNC:24869; Q9H3Q3
6023	GAL3ST3	HGNC:24144; Q96A11
6024	GAL3ST4	HGNC:24145; Q96RP7
6025	GALC	HGNC:4115; P54803
6026	GALE	HGNC:4116; Q14376
6027	GALK1	HGNC:4118; P51570
6028	GALK2	HGNC:4119; Q01415
6029	GALM	HGNC:24063; Q96C23
6030	GALNS	HGNC:4122; P34059
6031	GALNT1	HGNC:4123; Q10472
6032	GALNT2	HGNC:4124; Q10471
6033	GALNT3	HGNC:4125; Q14435
6034	GALNT4	HGNC:4126; Q8N4A0
6035	GALNT5	HGNC:4127; Q7Z7M9
6036	GALNT6	HGNC:4128; Q8NCL4
6037	GALNT7	HGNC:4129; Q86SF2
6038	GALNT8	HGNC:4130; Q9NY28
6039	GALNT9	HGNC:4131; Q9HCQ5
6040	GALNT10	HGNC:19873; Q86SR1
6041	GALNT11	HGNC:19875; Q8NCW6
6042	GALNT12	HGNC:19877; Q8IXK2
6043	GALNT13	HGNC:23242; Q8IUC8
6044	GALNT14	HGNC:22946; Q96FL9
6045	GALNT15	HGNC:21531; Q8N3T1
6046	GALNT16	HGNC:23233; Q8N428
6047	GALNT17	HGNC:16347; Q6IS24
6048	GALNT18	HGNC:30488; Q6P9A2
6049	GALNTL5	HGNC:21725; Q7Z4T8
6050	GALNTL6	HGNC:33844; Q49A17
6051	GALP	HGNC:24840; Q9UBC7
6052	GALR1	HGNC:4132; P47211
6053	GALR2	HGNC:4133; O43603
6054	GALR3	HGNC:4134; O60755
6055	GALT	HGNC:4135; P07902
6056	GAMT	HGNC:4136; Q14353
6057	GAN	HGNC:4137; Q9H2C0
6058	GANAB	HGNC:4138; Q14697
6059	GANC	HGNC:4139; Q8TET4
6060	GAP43	HGNC:4140; P17677
6061	GAPDH	HGNC:4141; P04406
6062	GAPDHS	HGNC:24864; O14556
6063	GAPT	HGNC:26588; Q8N292
6064	GAPVD1	HGNC:23375; Q14C86
6065	GAR1	HGNC:14264; Q9NY12
6066	GAREM1	HGNC:26136; Q9H706
6067	GAREM2	HGNC:27172; Q75VX8
6068	GARIN1A	HGNC:27998; Q6NXP2
6069	GARIN1B	HGNC:30704; Q96KD3
6070	GARIN2	HGNC:20101; Q8N9W8
6071	GARIN3	HGNC:28397; Q8TC56
6072	GARIN4	HGNC:26541; Q8IYT1
6073	GARIN5A	HGNC:25107; Q6IPT2
6074	GARIN5B	HGNC:25278; Q8N5Q1
6075	GARIN6	HGNC:28594; Q8NEG0
6076	GARNL3	HGNC:25425; Q5VVW2
6077	GARRE1	HGNC:29016; O15063
6078	GARS1	HGNC:4162; P41250
6079	GART	HGNC:4163; P22102
6080	GAS1	HGNC:4165; P54826
6081	GAS2	HGNC:4167; O43903
6082	GAS2L1	HGNC:16955; Q99501
6083	GAS2L2	HGNC:24846; Q8NHY3
6084	GAS2L3	HGNC:27475; Q86XJ1
6085	GAS6	HGNC:4168; Q14393
6086	GAS7	HGNC:4169; O60861
6087	GASK1A	HGNC:24485; Q9UFP1
6088	GASK1B	HGNC:25312; Q6UWH4
6089	GAST	HGNC:4164; P01350
6090	GATA1	HGNC:4170; P15976
6091	GATA2	HGNC:4171; P23769
6092	GATA3	HGNC:4172; P23771
6093	GATA4	HGNC:4173; P43694
6094	GATA5	HGNC:15802; Q9BWX5
6095	GATA6	HGNC:4174; Q92908
6096	GATAD1	HGNC:29941; Q8WUU5
6097	GATAD2A	HGNC:29989; Q86YP4
6098	GATAD2B	HGNC:30778; Q8WXI9
6099	GATB	HGNC:8849; O75879
6100	GATC	HGNC:25068; O43716
6101	GATD1	HGNC:26616; Q8NB37
6102	GATD3	HGNC:1273; P0DPI2
6103	GATM	HGNC:4175; P50440
6104	GBA1	HGNC:4177; P04062
6105	GBA2	HGNC:18986; Q9HCG7
6106	GBA3	HGNC:19069; Q9H227
6107	GBE1	HGNC:4180; Q04446
6108	GBF1	HGNC:4181; Q92538
6109	GBGT1	HGNC:20460; Q8N5D6
6110	GBP1	HGNC:4182; P32455
6111	GBP2	HGNC:4183; P32456
6112	GBP3	HGNC:4184; Q9H0R5
6113	GBP4	HGNC:20480; Q96PP9
6114	GBP5	HGNC:19895; Q96PP8
6115	GBP6	HGNC:25395; Q6ZN66
6116	GBP7	HGNC:29606; Q8N8V2
6117	GBX1	HGNC:4185; Q14549
6118	GBX2	HGNC:4186; P52951
6119	GC	HGNC:4187; P02774
6120	GCA	HGNC:15990; P28676
6121	GCAT	HGNC:4188; O75600
6122	GCC1	HGNC:19095; Q96CN9
6123	GCC2	HGNC:23218; Q8IWJ2
6124	GCDH	HGNC:4189; Q92947
6125	GCFC2	HGNC:1317; P16383
6126	GCG	HGNC:4191; P01275
6127	GCGR	HGNC:4192; P47871
6128	GCH1	HGNC:4193; P30793
6129	GCHFR	HGNC:4194; P30047
6130	GCK	HGNC:4195; P35557
6131	GCKR	HGNC:4196; Q14397
6132	GCLC	HGNC:4311; P48506
6133	GCLM	HGNC:4312; P48507
6134	GCM1	HGNC:4197; Q9NP62
6135	GCM2	HGNC:4198; O75603
6136	GCN1	HGNC:4199; Q92616
6137	GCNA	HGNC:15805; Q96QF7
6138	GCNT1	HGNC:4203; Q02742
6139	GCNT2	HGNC:4204; Q8N0V5
6140	GCNT3	HGNC:4205; O95395
6141	GCNT4	HGNC:17973; Q9P109
6142	GCNT7	HGNC:16099; Q6ZNI0
6143	GCSAM	HGNC:20253; Q8N6F7
6144	GCSAML	HGNC:29583; Q5JQS6
6145	GCSH	HGNC:4208; P23434
6146	GDA	HGNC:4212; Q9Y2T3
6147	GDAP1	HGNC:15968; Q8TB36
6148	GDAP1L1	HGNC:4213; Q96MZ0
6149	GDAP2	HGNC:18010; Q9NXN4
6150	GDE1	HGNC:29644; Q9NZC3
6151	GDF1	HGNC:4214; P27539
6152	GDF2	HGNC:4217; Q9UK05
6153	GDF3	HGNC:4218; Q9NR23
6154	GDF5	HGNC:4220; P43026
6155	GDF6	HGNC:4221; Q6KF10
6156	GDF7	HGNC:4222; Q7Z4P5
6157	GDF9	HGNC:4224; O60383
6158	GDF10	HGNC:4215; P55107
6159	GDF11	HGNC:4216; O95390
6160	GDF15	HGNC:30142; Q99988
6161	GDI1	HGNC:4226; P31150
6162	GDI2	HGNC:4227; P50395
6163	GDNF	HGNC:4232; P39905
6164	GDPD1	HGNC:20883; Q8N9F7
6165	GDPD2	HGNC:25974; Q9HCC8
6166	GDPD3	HGNC:28638; Q7L5L3
6167	GDPD4	HGNC:24849; Q6W3E5
6168	GDPD5	HGNC:28804; Q8WTR4
6169	GDPGP1	HGNC:34360; Q6ZNW5
6170	GEM	HGNC:4234; P55040
6171	GEMIN2	HGNC:10884; O14893
6172	GEMIN4	HGNC:15717; P57678
6173	GEMIN5	HGNC:20043; Q8TEQ6
6174	GEMIN6	HGNC:20044; Q8WXD5
6175	GEMIN7	HGNC:20045; Q9H840
6176	GEMIN8	HGNC:26044; Q9NWZ8
6177	GEN1	HGNC:26881; Q17RS7
6178	GET1	HGNC:12790; O00258
6179	GET3	HGNC:752; O43681
6180	GET4	HGNC:21690; Q7L5D6
6181	GFAP	HGNC:4235; P14136
6182	GFER	HGNC:4236; P55789
6183	GFI1	HGNC:4237; Q99684
6184	GFI1B	HGNC:4238; Q5VTD9
6185	GFM1	HGNC:13780; Q96RP9
6186	GFM2	HGNC:29682; Q969S9
6187	GFOD1	HGNC:21096; Q9NXC2
6188	GFOD2	HGNC:28159; Q3B7J2
6189	GFPT1	HGNC:4241; Q06210
6190	GFPT2	HGNC:4242; O94808
6191	GFRA1	HGNC:4243; P56159
6192	GFRA2	HGNC:4244; O00451
6193	GFRA3	HGNC:4245; O60609
6194	GFRA4	HGNC:13821; Q9GZZ7
6195	GFRAL	HGNC:32789; Q6UXV0
6196	GFUS	HGNC:12390; Q13630
6197	GFY	HGNC:44663; I3L273
6198	GGA1	HGNC:17842; Q9UJY5
6199	GGA2	HGNC:16064; Q9UJY4
6200	GGA3	HGNC:17079; Q9NZ52
6201	GGACT	HGNC:25100; Q9BVM4
6202	GGCT	HGNC:21705; O75223
6203	GGCX	HGNC:4247; P38435
6204	GGH	HGNC:4248; Q92820
6205	GGN	HGNC:18869; Q86UU5
6206	GGNBP2	HGNC:19357; Q9H3C7
6207	GGPS1	HGNC:4249; O95749
6208	GGT1	HGNC:4250; P19440
6209	GGT5	HGNC:4260; P36269
6210	GGT6	HGNC:26891; Q6P531
6211	GGT7	HGNC:4259; Q9UJ14
6212	GGTA1	HGNC:4253; Q4G0N0
6213	GGTLC1	HGNC:16437; Q9BX51
6214	GGTLC2	HGNC:18596; Q14390
6215	GGTLC3	HGNC:33426; B5MD39
6216	GH1	HGNC:4261; P01241
6217	GH2	HGNC:4262; P01242
6218	GHDC	HGNC:24438; Q8N2G8
6219	GHITM	HGNC:17281; Q9H3K2
6220	GHR	HGNC:4263; P10912
6221	GHRH	HGNC:4265; P01286
6222	GHRHR	HGNC:4266; Q02643
6223	GHRL	HGNC:18129; Q9UBU3
6224	GHSR	HGNC:4267; Q92847
6225	GID4	HGNC:28453; Q8IVV7
6226	GID8	HGNC:15857; Q9NWU2
6227	GIGYF1	HGNC:9126; O75420
6228	GIGYF2	HGNC:11960; Q6Y7W6
6229	GIMAP1	HGNC:23237; Q8WWP7
6230	GIMAP2	HGNC:21789; Q9UG22
6231	GIMAP4	HGNC:21872; Q9NUV9
6232	GIMAP5	HGNC:18005; Q96F15
6233	GIMAP6	HGNC:21918; Q6P9H5
6234	GIMAP7	HGNC:22404; Q8NHV1
6235	GIMAP8	HGNC:21792; Q8ND71
6236	GIMD1	HGNC:44141; P0DJR0
6237	GIN1	HGNC:25959; Q9NXP7
6238	GINM1	HGNC:21074; Q9NU53
6239	GINS1	HGNC:28980; Q14691
6240	GINS2	HGNC:24575; Q9Y248
6241	GINS3	HGNC:25851; Q9BRX5
6242	GINS4	HGNC:28226; Q9BRT9
6243	GIP	HGNC:4270; P09681
6244	GIPC1	HGNC:1226; O14908
6245	GIPC2	HGNC:18177; Q8TF65
6246	GIPC3	HGNC:18183; Q8TF64
6247	GIPR	HGNC:4271; P48546
6248	GIT1	HGNC:4272; Q9Y2X7
6249	GIT2	HGNC:4273; Q14161
6250	GJA1	HGNC:4274; P17302
6251	GJA3	HGNC:4277; Q9Y6H8
6252	GJA4	HGNC:4278; P35212
6253	GJA5	HGNC:4279; P36382
6254	GJA8	HGNC:4281; P48165
6255	GJA9	HGNC:19155; P57773
6256	GJA10	HGNC:16995; Q969M2
6257	GJB1	HGNC:4283; P08034
6258	GJB2	HGNC:4284; P29033
6259	GJB3	HGNC:4285; O75712
6260	GJB4	HGNC:4286; Q9NTQ9
6261	GJB5	HGNC:4287; O95377
6262	GJB6	HGNC:4288; O95452
6263	GJB7	HGNC:16690; Q6PEY0
6264	GJC1	HGNC:4280; P36383
6265	GJC2	HGNC:17494; Q5T442
6266	GJC3	HGNC:17495; Q8NFK1
6267	GJD2	HGNC:19154; Q9UKL4
6268	GJD3	HGNC:19147; Q8N144
6269	GJD4	HGNC:23296; Q96KN9
6270	GJE1	HGNC:33251; A6NN92
6271	GK	HGNC:4289; P32189
6272	GK2	HGNC:4291; Q14410
6273	GK3	HGNC:4292; Q14409
6274	GK5	HGNC:28635; Q6ZS86
6275	GKAP1	HGNC:17496; Q5VSY0
6276	GKN1	HGNC:23217; Q9NS71
6277	GKN2	HGNC:24588; Q86XP6
6278	GLA	HGNC:4296; P06280
6279	GLB1	HGNC:4298; P16278
6280	GLB1L	HGNC:28129; Q6UWU2
6281	GLB1L2	HGNC:25129; Q8IW92
6282	GLB1L3	HGNC:25147; Q8NCI6
6283	GLCCI1	HGNC:18713; Q86VQ1
6284	GLCE	HGNC:17855; O94923
6285	GLDC	HGNC:4313; P23378
6286	GLDN	HGNC:29514; Q6ZMI3
6287	GLE1	HGNC:4315; Q53GS7
6288	GLG1	HGNC:4316; Q92896
6289	GLI1	HGNC:4317; P08151
6290	GLI2	HGNC:4318; P10070
6291	GLI3	HGNC:4319; P10071
6292	GLI4	HGNC:4320; P10075
6293	GLIPR1	HGNC:17001; P48060
6294	GLIPR1L1	HGNC:28392; Q6UWM5
6295	GLIPR1L2	HGNC:28592; Q4G1C9
6296	GLIPR2	HGNC:18007; Q9H4G4
6297	GLIS1	HGNC:29525; Q8NBF1
6298	GLIS2	HGNC:29450; Q9BZE0
6299	GLIS3	HGNC:28510; Q8NEA6
6300	GLMN	HGNC:14373; Q92990
6301	GLMP	HGNC:29436; Q8WWB7
6302	GLO1	HGNC:4323; Q04760
6303	GLOD4	HGNC:14111; Q9HC38
6304	GLOD5	HGNC:33358; A6NK44
6305	GLP1R	HGNC:4324; P43220
6306	GLP2R	HGNC:4325; O95838
6307	GLRA1	HGNC:4326; P23415
6308	GLRA2	HGNC:4327; P23416
6309	GLRA3	HGNC:4328; O75311
6310	GLRB	HGNC:4329; P48167
6311	GLRX	HGNC:4330; P35754
6312	GLRX2	HGNC:16065; Q9NS18
6313	GLRX3	HGNC:15987; O76003
6314	GLRX5	HGNC:20134; Q86SX6
6315	GLS	HGNC:4331; O94925
6316	GLS2	HGNC:29570; Q9UI32
6317	GLT1D1	HGNC:26483; Q96MS3
6318	GLT6D1	HGNC:23671; Q7Z4J2
6319	GLT8D1	HGNC:24870; Q68CQ7
6320	GLT8D2	HGNC:24890; Q9H1C3
6321	GLTP	HGNC:24867; Q9NZD2
6322	GLTPD2	HGNC:33756; A6NH11
6323	GLUD1	HGNC:4335; P00367
6324	GLUD2	HGNC:4336; P49448
6325	GLUL	HGNC:4341; P15104
6326	GLYAT	HGNC:13734; Q6IB77
6327	GLYATL1	HGNC:30519; Q969I3
6328	GLYATL1B	HGNC:37865; A0A0U1RQE8
6329	GLYATL2	HGNC:24178; Q8WU03
6330	GLYATL3	HGNC:21349; Q5SZD4
6331	GLYCTK	HGNC:24247; Q8IVS8
6332	GLYR1	HGNC:24434; Q49A26
6333	GM2A	HGNC:4367; P17900
6334	GMCL1	HGNC:23843; Q96IK5
6335	GMCL2	HGNC:19717; Q8NEA9
6336	GMDS	HGNC:4369; O60547
6337	GMEB1	HGNC:4370; Q9Y692
6338	GMEB2	HGNC:4371; Q9UKD1
6339	GMFB	HGNC:4373; P60983
6340	GMFG	HGNC:4374; O60234
6341	GMIP	HGNC:24852; Q9P107
6342	GML	HGNC:4375; Q99445
6343	GMNC	HGNC:40049; A6NCL1
6344	GMNN	HGNC:17493; O75496
6345	GMPPA	HGNC:22923; Q96IJ6
6346	GMPPB	HGNC:22932; Q9Y5P6
6347	GMPR	HGNC:4376; P36959
6348	GMPR2	HGNC:4377; Q9P2T1
6349	GMPS	HGNC:4378; P49915
6350	GNA11	HGNC:4379; P29992
6351	GNA12	HGNC:4380; Q03113
6352	GNA13	HGNC:4381; Q14344
6353	GNA14	HGNC:4382; O95837
6354	GNA15	HGNC:4383; P30679
6355	GNAI1	HGNC:4384; P63096
6356	GNAI2	HGNC:4385; P04899
6357	GNAI3	HGNC:4387; P08754
6358	GNAL	HGNC:4388; P38405
6359	GNAO1	HGNC:4389; P09471
6360	GNAQ	HGNC:4390; P50148
6361	GNAS	HGNC:4392; O95467, P63092, P84996, Q5JWF2
6362	GNAT1	HGNC:4393; P11488
6363	GNAT2	HGNC:4394; P19087
6364	GNAT3	HGNC:22800; A8MTJ3
6365	GNAZ	HGNC:4395; P19086
6366	GNB1	HGNC:4396; P62873
6367	GNB1L	HGNC:4397; Q9BYB4
6368	GNB2	HGNC:4398; P62879
6369	GNB3	HGNC:4400; P16520
6370	GNB4	HGNC:20731; Q9HAV0
6371	GNB5	HGNC:4401; O14775
6372	GNE	HGNC:23657; Q9Y223
6373	GNG2	HGNC:4404; P59768
6374	GNG3	HGNC:4405; P63215
6375	GNG4	HGNC:4407; P50150
6376	GNG5	HGNC:4408; P63218
6377	GNG5B	HGNC:24826; A0A804HLA8
6378	GNG7	HGNC:4410; O60262
6379	GNG8	HGNC:19664; Q9UK08
6380	GNG10	HGNC:4402; P50151
6381	GNG11	HGNC:4403; P61952
6382	GNG12	HGNC:19663; Q9UBI6
6383	GNG13	HGNC:14131; Q9P2W3
6384	GNG14	HGNC:53439; A0A1W2PPG7
6385	GNGT1	HGNC:4411; P63211
6386	GNGT2	HGNC:4412; O14610
6387	GNL1	HGNC:4413; P36915
6388	GNL2	HGNC:29925; Q13823
6389	GNL3	HGNC:29931; Q9BVP2
6390	GNL3L	HGNC:25553; Q9NVN8
6391	GNLY	HGNC:4414; P22749
6392	GNMT	HGNC:4415; Q14749
6393	GNPAT	HGNC:4416; O15228
6394	GNPDA1	HGNC:4417; P46926
6395	GNPDA2	HGNC:21526; Q8TDQ7
6396	GNPNAT1	HGNC:19980; Q96EK6
6397	GNPTAB	HGNC:29670; Q3T906
6398	GNPTG	HGNC:23026; Q9UJJ9
6399	GNRH1	HGNC:4419; P01148
6400	GNRH2	HGNC:4420; O43555
6401	GNRHR	HGNC:4421; P30968
6402	GNS	HGNC:4422; P15586
6403	GOLGA1	HGNC:4424; Q92805
6404	GOLGA2	HGNC:4425; Q08379
6405	GOLGA3	HGNC:4426; Q08378
6406	GOLGA4	HGNC:4427; Q13439
6407	GOLGA5	HGNC:4428; Q8TBA6
6408	GOLGA6A	HGNC:13567; Q9NYA3
6409	GOLGA6B	HGNC:32205; A6NDN3
6410	GOLGA6C	HGNC:32206; A6NDK9
6411	GOLGA6D	HGNC:32204; P0CG33
6412	GOLGA6L1	HGNC:37444; Q8N7Z2
6413	GOLGA6L2	HGNC:26695; Q8N9W4
6414	GOLGA6L4	HGNC:27256; A6NEF3
6415	GOLGA6L6	HGNC:37225; A8MZA4
6416	GOLGA6L7	HGNC:37442; A0A1B0GV03
6417	GOLGA6L9	HGNC:37229; A6NEM1
6418	GOLGA6L10	HGNC:37228; A6NI86
6419	GOLGA6L19	HGNC:49416; H0YKK7
6420	GOLGA6L22	HGNC:50289; H0YM25
6421	GOLGA6L24	HGNC:55710; P0DX00
6422	GOLGA6L25	HGNC:55711; P0DX01
6423	GOLGA6L26	HGNC:56306; P0DX02
6424	GOLGA7	HGNC:24876; Q7Z5G4
6425	GOLGA7B	HGNC:31668; Q2TAP0
6426	GOLGA8A	HGNC:31972; A7E2F4
6427	GOLGA8B	HGNC:31973; A8MQT2
6428	GOLGA8F	HGNC:32378; P0DX52
6429	GOLGA8G	HGNC:25328; P0DX53
6430	GOLGA8H	HGNC:37443; P0CJ92
6431	GOLGA8J	HGNC:38650; A6NMD2
6432	GOLGA8K	HGNC:38652; D6RF30
6433	GOLGA8M	HGNC:44404; H3BSY2
6434	GOLGA8N	HGNC:44405; F8WBI6
6435	GOLGA8O	HGNC:44406; A6NCC3
6436	GOLGA8Q	HGNC:44408; H3BV12
6437	GOLGA8R	HGNC:44407; I6L899
6438	GOLGA8S	HGNC:44409; H3BPF8
6439	GOLGA8T	HGNC:44410; H3BQL2
6440	GOLGB1	HGNC:4429; Q14789
6441	GOLIM4	HGNC:15448; O00461
6442	GOLM1	HGNC:15451; Q8NBJ4
6443	GOLM2	HGNC:24892; Q6P4E1
6444	GOLPH3	HGNC:15452; Q9H4A6
6445	GOLPH3L	HGNC:24882; Q9H4A5
6446	GOLT1A	HGNC:24766; Q6ZVE7
6447	GOLT1B	HGNC:20175; Q9Y3E0
6448	GON4L	HGNC:25973; Q3T8J9
6449	GON7	HGNC:20356; Q9BXV9
6450	GOPC	HGNC:17643; Q9HD26
6451	GORAB	HGNC:25676; Q5T7V8
6452	GORASP1	HGNC:16769; Q9BQQ3
6453	GORASP2	HGNC:17500; Q9H8Y8
6454	GOSR1	HGNC:4430; O95249
6455	GOSR2	HGNC:4431; O14653
6456	GOT1	HGNC:4432; P17174
6457	GOT1L1	HGNC:28487; Q8NHS2
6458	GOT2	HGNC:4433; P00505
6459	GP1BA	HGNC:4439; P07359
6460	GP1BB	HGNC:4440; P13224
6461	GP2	HGNC:4441; P55259
6462	GP5	HGNC:4443; P40197
6463	GP6	HGNC:14388; Q9HCN6
6464	GP9	HGNC:4444; P14770
6465	GPA33	HGNC:4445; Q99795
6466	GPAA1	HGNC:4446; O43292
6467	GPALPP1	HGNC:20298; Q8IXQ4
6468	GPAM	HGNC:24865; Q9HCL2
6469	GPANK1	HGNC:13920; O95872
6470	GPAT2	HGNC:27168; Q6NUI2
6471	GPAT3	HGNC:28157; Q53EU6
6472	GPAT4	HGNC:20880; Q86UL3
6473	GPATCH1	HGNC:24658; Q9BRR8
6474	GPATCH2	HGNC:25499; Q9NW75
6475	GPATCH2L	HGNC:20210; Q9NWQ4
6476	GPATCH3	HGNC:25720; Q96I76
6477	GPATCH4	HGNC:25982; Q5T3I0
6478	GPATCH8	HGNC:29066; Q9UKJ3
6479	GPATCH11	HGNC:26768; Q8N954
6480	GPBAR1	HGNC:19680; Q8TDU6
6481	GPBP1	HGNC:29520; Q86WP2
6482	GPBP1L1	HGNC:28843; Q9HC44
6483	GPC1	HGNC:4449; P35052
6484	GPC2	HGNC:4450; Q8N158
6485	GPC3	HGNC:4451; P51654
6486	GPC4	HGNC:4452; O75487
6487	GPC5	HGNC:4453; P78333
6488	GPC6	HGNC:4454; Q9Y625
6489	GPCPD1	HGNC:26957; Q9NPB8
6490	GPD1	HGNC:4455; P21695
6491	GPD1L	HGNC:28956; Q8N335
6492	GPD2	HGNC:4456; P43304
6493	GPER1	HGNC:4485; Q99527
6494	GPHA2	HGNC:18054; Q96T91
6495	GPHB5	HGNC:18055; Q86YW7
6496	GPHN	HGNC:15465; Q9NQX3
6497	GPI	HGNC:4458; P06744
6498	GPIHBP1	HGNC:24945; Q8IV16
6499	GPKOW	HGNC:30677; Q92917
6500	GPLD1	HGNC:4459; P80108
6501	GPM6A	HGNC:4460; P51674
6502	GPM6B	HGNC:4461; Q13491
6503	GPN1	HGNC:17030; Q9HCN4
6504	GPN2	HGNC:25513; Q9H9Y4
6505	GPN3	HGNC:30186; Q9UHW5
6506	GPNMB	HGNC:4462; Q14956
6507	GPR3	HGNC:4484; P46089
6508	GPR4	HGNC:4497; P46093
6509	GPR6	HGNC:4515; P46095
6510	GPR12	HGNC:4466; P47775
6511	GPR15	HGNC:4469; P49685
6512	GPR15LG	HGNC:31428; Q6UWK7
6513	GPR17	HGNC:4471; Q13304
6514	GPR18	HGNC:4472; Q14330
6515	GPR19	HGNC:4473; Q15760
6516	GPR20	HGNC:4475; Q99678
6517	GPR21	HGNC:4476; Q99679
6518	GPR22	HGNC:4477; Q99680
6519	GPR25	HGNC:4480; O00155
6520	GPR26	HGNC:4481; Q8NDV2
6521	GPR27	HGNC:4482; Q9NS67
6522	GPR31	HGNC:4486; O00270
6523	GPR32	HGNC:4487; O75388
6524	GPR33	HGNC:4489; Q49SQ1
6525	GPR34	HGNC:4490; Q9UPC5
6526	GPR35	HGNC:4492; Q9HC97
6527	GPR37	HGNC:4494; O15354
6528	GPR37L1	HGNC:14923; O60883
6529	GPR39	HGNC:4496; O43194
6530	GPR42	HGNC:4500; O15529
6531	GPR45	HGNC:4503; Q9Y5Y3
6532	GPR50	HGNC:4506; Q13585
6533	GPR52	HGNC:4508; Q9Y2T5
6534	GPR55	HGNC:4511; Q9Y2T6
6535	GPR61	HGNC:13300; Q9BZJ8
6536	GPR62	HGNC:13301; Q9BZJ7
6537	GPR63	HGNC:13302; Q9BZJ6
6538	GPR65	HGNC:4517; Q8IYL9
6539	GPR68	HGNC:4519; Q15743
6540	GPR75	HGNC:4526; O95800
6541	GPR78	HGNC:4528; Q96P69
6542	GPR82	HGNC:4533; Q96P67
6543	GPR83	HGNC:4523; Q9NYM4
6544	GPR84	HGNC:4535; Q9NQS5
6545	GPR85	HGNC:4536; P60893
6546	GPR87	HGNC:4538; Q9BY21
6547	GPR88	HGNC:4539; Q9GZN0
6548	GPR89A	HGNC:31984; B7ZAQ6
6549	GPR89B	HGNC:13840; P0CG08
6550	GPR101	HGNC:14963; Q96P66
6551	GPR107	HGNC:17830; Q5VW38
6552	GPR108	HGNC:17829; Q9NPR9
6553	GPR119	HGNC:19060; Q8TDV5
6554	GPR132	HGNC:17482; Q9UNW8
6555	GPR135	HGNC:19991; Q8IZ08
6556	GPR137	HGNC:24300; Q96N19
6557	GPR137B	HGNC:11862; O60478
6558	GPR137C	HGNC:25445; Q8N3F9
6559	GPR139	HGNC:19995; Q6DWJ6
6560	GPR141	HGNC:19997; Q7Z602
6561	GPR142	HGNC:20088; Q7Z601
6562	GPR143	HGNC:20145; P51810
6563	GPR146	HGNC:21718; Q96CH1
6564	GPR148	HGNC:23623; Q8TDV2
6565	GPR149	HGNC:23627; Q86SP6
6566	GPR150	HGNC:23628; Q8NGU9
6567	GPR151	HGNC:23624; Q8TDV0
6568	GPR152	HGNC:23622; Q8TDT2
6569	GPR153	HGNC:23618; Q6NV75
6570	GPR155	HGNC:22951; Q7Z3F1
6571	GPR156	HGNC:20844; Q8NFN8
6572	GPR157	HGNC:23687; Q5UAW9
6573	GPR158	HGNC:23689; Q5T848
6574	GPR160	HGNC:23693; Q9UJ42
6575	GPR161	HGNC:23694; Q8N6U8
6576	GPR162	HGNC:16693; Q16538
6577	GPR171	HGNC:30057; O14626
6578	GPR173	HGNC:18186; Q9NS66
6579	GPR174	HGNC:30245; Q9BXC1
6580	GPR176	HGNC:32370; Q14439
6581	GPR179	HGNC:31371; Q6PRD1
6582	GPR180	HGNC:28899; Q86V85
6583	GPR183	HGNC:3128; P32249
6584	GPRASP1	HGNC:24834; Q5JY77
6585	GPRASP2	HGNC:25169; Q96D09
6586	GPRASP3	HGNC:29353; Q6PI77
6587	GPRC5A	HGNC:9836; Q8NFJ5
6588	GPRC5B	HGNC:13308; Q9NZH0
6589	GPRC5C	HGNC:13309; Q9NQ84
6590	GPRC5D	HGNC:13310; Q9NZD1
6591	GPRC6A	HGNC:18510; Q5T6X5
6592	GPRIN1	HGNC:24835; Q7Z2K8
6593	GPRIN2	HGNC:23730; O60269
6594	GPRIN3	HGNC:27733; Q6ZVF9
6595	GPS1	HGNC:4549; Q13098
6596	GPS2	HGNC:4550; Q13227
6597	GPSM1	HGNC:17858; Q86YR5
6598	GPSM2	HGNC:29501; P81274
6599	GPSM3	HGNC:13945; Q9Y4H4
6600	GPT	HGNC:4552; P24298
6601	GPT2	HGNC:18062; Q8TD30
6602	GPX1	HGNC:4553; P07203
6603	GPX2	HGNC:4554; P18283
6604	GPX3	HGNC:4555; P22352
6605	GPX4	HGNC:4556; P36969
6606	GPX5	HGNC:4557; O75715
6607	GPX6	HGNC:4558; P59796
6608	GPX7	HGNC:4559; Q96SL4
6609	GPX8	HGNC:33100; Q8TED1
6610	GRAMD1A	HGNC:29305; Q96CP6
6611	GRAMD1B	HGNC:29214; Q3KR37
6612	GRAMD1C	HGNC:25252; Q8IYS0
6613	GRAMD2A	HGNC:27287; Q8IUY3
6614	GRAMD2B	HGNC:24911; Q96HH9
6615	GRAMD4	HGNC:29113; Q6IC98
6616	GRAP	HGNC:4562; Q13588
6617	GRAP2	HGNC:4563; O75791
6618	GRAPL	HGNC:37240; Q8TC17
6619	GRB2	HGNC:4566; P62993
6620	GRB7	HGNC:4567; Q14451
6621	GRB10	HGNC:4564; Q13322
6622	GRB14	HGNC:4565; Q14449
6623	GREB1	HGNC:24885; Q4ZG55
6624	GREB1L	HGNC:31042; Q9C091
6625	GREM1	HGNC:2001; O60565
6626	GREM2	HGNC:17655; Q9H772
6627	GREP1	HGNC:27549; A0A0J9YXV3
6628	GRHL1	HGNC:17923; Q9NZI5
6629	GRHL2	HGNC:2799; Q6ISB3
6630	GRHL3	HGNC:25839; Q8TE85
6631	GRHPR	HGNC:4570; Q9UBQ7
6632	GRIA1	HGNC:4571; P42261
6633	GRIA2	HGNC:4572; P42262
6634	GRIA3	HGNC:4573; P42263
6635	GRIA4	HGNC:4574; P48058
6636	GRID1	HGNC:4575; Q9ULK0
6637	GRID2	HGNC:4576; O43424
6638	GRID2IP	HGNC:18464; A4D2P6
6639	GRIFIN	HGNC:4577; A4D1Z8
6640	GRIK1	HGNC:4579; P39086
6641	GRIK2	HGNC:4580; Q13002
6642	GRIK3	HGNC:4581; Q13003
6643	GRIK4	HGNC:4582; Q16099
6644	GRIK5	HGNC:4583; Q16478
6645	GRIN1	HGNC:4584; Q05586
6646	GRIN2A	HGNC:4585; Q12879
6647	GRIN2B	HGNC:4586; Q13224
6648	GRIN2C	HGNC:4587; Q14957
6649	GRIN2D	HGNC:4588; O15399
6650	GRIN3A	HGNC:16767; Q8TCU5
6651	GRIN3B	HGNC:16768; O60391
6652	GRINA	HGNC:4589; Q7Z429
6653	GRIP1	HGNC:18708; Q9Y3R0
6654	GRIP2	HGNC:23841; Q9C0E4
6655	GRIPAP1	HGNC:18706; Q4V328
6656	GRK1	HGNC:10013; Q15835
6657	GRK2	HGNC:289; P25098
6658	GRK3	HGNC:290; P35626
6659	GRK4	HGNC:4543; P32298
6660	GRK5	HGNC:4544; P34947
6661	GRK6	HGNC:4545; P43250
6662	GRK7	HGNC:17031; Q8WTQ7
6663	GRM1	HGNC:4593; Q13255
6664	GRM2	HGNC:4594; Q14416
6665	GRM3	HGNC:4595; Q14832
6666	GRM4	HGNC:4596; Q14833
6667	GRM5	HGNC:4597; P41594
6668	GRM6	HGNC:4598; O15303
6669	GRM7	HGNC:4599; Q14831
6670	GRM8	HGNC:4600; O00222
6671	GRN	HGNC:4601; P28799
6672	GRP	HGNC:4605; P07492
6673	GRPEL1	HGNC:19696; Q9HAV7
6674	GRPEL2	HGNC:21060; Q8TAA5
6675	GRPR	HGNC:4609; P30550
6676	GRSF1	HGNC:4610; Q12849
6677	GRTP1	HGNC:20310; Q5TC63
6678	GRWD1	HGNC:21270; Q9BQ67
6679	GRXCR1	HGNC:31673; A8MXD5
6680	GRXCR2	HGNC:33862; A6NFK2
6681	GSAP	HGNC:28042; A4D1B5
6682	GSC	HGNC:4612; P56915
6683	GSC2	HGNC:4613; O15499
6684	GSDMA	HGNC:13311; Q96QA5
6685	GSDMB	HGNC:23690; Q8TAX9
6686	GSDMC	HGNC:7151; Q9BYG8
6687	GSDMD	HGNC:25697; P57764
6688	GSDME	HGNC:2810; O60443
6689	GSE1	HGNC:28979; Q14687
6690	GSG1	HGNC:19716; Q2KHT4
6691	GSG1L	HGNC:28283; Q6UXU4
6692	GSG1L2	HGNC:51826; A8MUP6
6693	GSK3A	HGNC:4616; P49840
6694	GSK3B	HGNC:4617; P49841
6695	GSKIP	HGNC:20343; Q9P0R6
6696	GSN	HGNC:4620; P06396
6697	GSPT1	HGNC:4621; P15170
6698	GSPT2	HGNC:4622; Q8IYD1
6699	GSR	HGNC:4623; P00390
6700	GSS	HGNC:4624; P48637
6701	GSTA1	HGNC:4626; P08263
6702	GSTA2	HGNC:4627; P09210
6703	GSTA3	HGNC:4628; Q16772
6704	GSTA4	HGNC:4629; O15217
6705	GSTA5	HGNC:19662; Q7RTV2
6706	GSTCD	HGNC:25806; Q8NEC7
6707	GSTK1	HGNC:16906; Q9Y2Q3
6708	GSTM1	HGNC:4632; P09488
6709	GSTM2	HGNC:4634; P28161
6710	GSTM3	HGNC:4635; P21266
6711	GSTM4	HGNC:4636; Q03013
6712	GSTM5	HGNC:4637; P46439
6713	GSTO1	HGNC:13312; P78417
6714	GSTO2	HGNC:23064; Q9H4Y5
6715	GSTP1	HGNC:4638; P09211
6716	GSTT2	HGNC:4642; P0CG29
6717	GSTT2B	HGNC:33437; P0CG30
6718	GSTT4	HGNC:26930; A0A1W2PR19
6719	GSTZ1	HGNC:4643; O43708
6720	GSX1	HGNC:20374; Q9H4S2
6721	GSX2	HGNC:24959; Q9BZM3
6722	GTF2A1	HGNC:4646; P52655
6723	GTF2A1L	HGNC:30727; Q9UNN4
6724	GTF2A2	HGNC:4647; P52657
6725	GTF2B	HGNC:4648; Q00403
6726	GTF2E1	HGNC:4650; P29083
6727	GTF2E2	HGNC:4651; P29084
6728	GTF2F1	HGNC:4652; P35269
6729	GTF2F2	HGNC:4653; P13984
6730	GTF2H1	HGNC:4655; P32780
6731	GTF2H2	HGNC:4656; Q13888
6732	GTF2H2C	HGNC:31394; Q6P1K8
6733	GTF2H3	HGNC:4657; Q13889
6734	GTF2H4	HGNC:4658; Q92759
6735	GTF2H5	HGNC:21157; Q6ZYL4
6736	GTF2I	HGNC:4659; P78347
6737	GTF2IRD1	HGNC:4661; Q9UHL9
6738	GTF2IRD2	HGNC:30775; Q86UP8
6739	GTF2IRD2B	HGNC:33125; Q6EKJ0
6740	GTF3A	HGNC:4662; Q92664
6741	GTF3C1	HGNC:4664; Q12789
6742	GTF3C2	HGNC:4665; Q8WUA4
6743	GTF3C3	HGNC:4666; Q9Y5Q9
6744	GTF3C4	HGNC:4667; Q9UKN8
6745	GTF3C5	HGNC:4668; Q9Y5Q8
6746	GTF3C6	HGNC:20872; Q969F1
6747	GTPBP1	HGNC:4669; O00178
6748	GTPBP2	HGNC:4670; Q9BX10
6749	GTPBP3	HGNC:14880; Q969Y2
6750	GTPBP4	HGNC:21535; Q9BZE4
