= GAGE2A =

Protein-coding gene in humans

Identifiers
- Aliases: GAGE2A, CT4.2, GAGE-2, GAGE-2A, GAGE2, G antigen 2A
- External IDs: OMIM: 300720; GeneCards: GAGE2A

Gene location (Human)
Chr.	X chromosome (human)
Band	Xp11.23	Start	49,589,496 bp
Band	Xp11.23	End	49,596,824 bp
RNA expression pattern
Bgee	Human / Mouse (ortholog); Top expressed in: testicle; right testis; left testis; gonad; right coronary artery; ectocervix; right lung; urinary bladder; blood; gastrocnemius muscle / n/a; More reference expression data
BioGPS	n/a
Orthologs
Databases	NCBI: entry; OMA: entry
Species	Human	Mouse
Entrez	729447	n/a
Ensembl	ENSG00000189064	n/a
UniProt	Q6NT46	n/a
RefSeq (mRNA)	NM_001127212	n/a
RefSeq (protein)	NP_001120684	n/a
Location (UCSC)	Chr X: 49.59 – 49.6 Mb	n/a
PubMed search		n/a
- Wikidata
View/Edit Human

G antigen 2A is a protein that in humans is encoded by the GAGE2A gene. The gene is part of a multigene family that is commonly expressed across various tumors. Its expression in healthy tissues is typically limited to germ cells.
