= GPR153 =

Protein-coding gene in humans

Identifiers
- Aliases: GPR153, PGR1, G protein-coupled receptor 153
- External IDs: OMIM: 614269; MGI: 1916157; GeneCards: GPR153

Gene location (Human)
Chr.	Chromosome 1 (human)
Band	1p36.31	Start	6,247,353 bp
Band	1p36.31	End	6,261,098 bp

Gene location (Mouse)
Chr.	Chromosome 4 (mouse)
Band	4|4 E2	Start	152,358,689 bp
Band	4|4 E2	End	152,369,794 bp
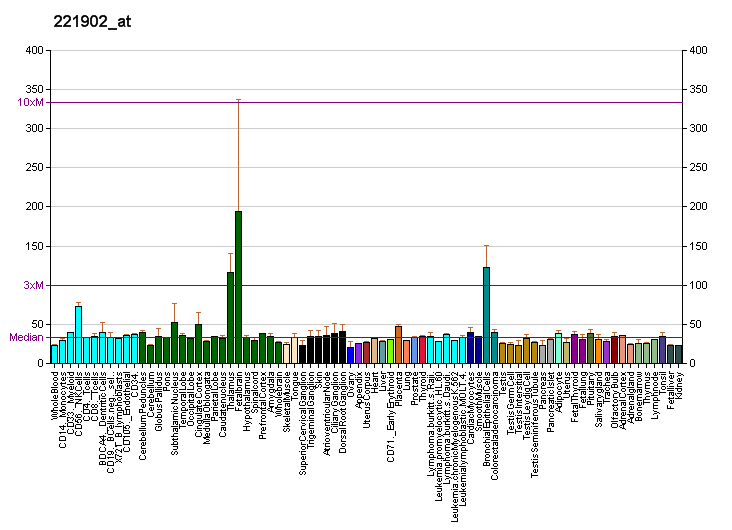

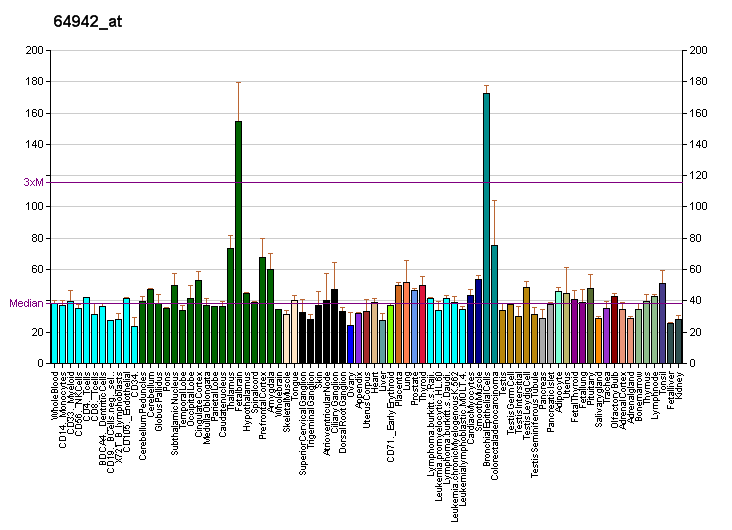
RNA expression pattern
Bgee	Human / Mouse (ortholog); Top expressed in: mucosa of ileum; lateral nuclear group of thalamus; pancreatic ductal cell; cerebellar vermis; endothelial cell; ganglionic eminence; vulva; gingival epithelium; periodontal fiber; apex of heart / Top expressed in: membranous bone; aortic valve; Dermatocranium; mandible; ascending aorta; maxilla; lumbar spinal ganglion; body of femur; lip; molar; More reference expression data
BioGPS	More reference expression data
Gene ontology
Molecular function	G protein-coupled receptor activity; signal transducer activity
Cellular component	integral component of membrane; plasma membrane; membrane
Biological process	G protein-coupled receptor signaling pathway; signal transduction
Sources:Amigo / QuickGO
Orthologs
Databases	NCBI: entry; OMA: entry
Species	Human	Mouse
Entrez	387509	100129
Ensembl	ENSG00000158292	ENSMUSG00000042804
UniProt	Q6NV75	Q8K0Z9
RefSeq (mRNA)	NM_207370	NM_178406; NM_001374784
RefSeq (protein)	NP_997253	NP_848493; NP_001361713
Location (UCSC)	Chr 1: 6.25 – 6.26 Mb	Chr 4: 152.36 – 152.37 Mb
PubMed search
- Wikidata
View/Edit Human	View/Edit Mouse

Probable G-protein coupled receptor 153 is a protein that in humans is encoded by the GPR153 gene.
