= GNG3 =

Protein-coding gene in the species Homo sapiens

Identifiers
- Aliases: GNG3, G protein subunit gamma 3, HG3D
- External IDs: OMIM: 608941; MGI: 102704; GeneCards: GNG3

Gene location (Human)
Chr.	Chromosome 11 (human)
Band	11q12.3	Start	62,707,676 bp
Band	11q12.3	End	62,709,201 bp

Gene location (Mouse)
Chr.	Chromosome 19 (mouse)
Band	19 A|19 5.76 cM	Start	8,814,297 bp
Band	19 A|19 5.76 cM	End	8,816,558 bp
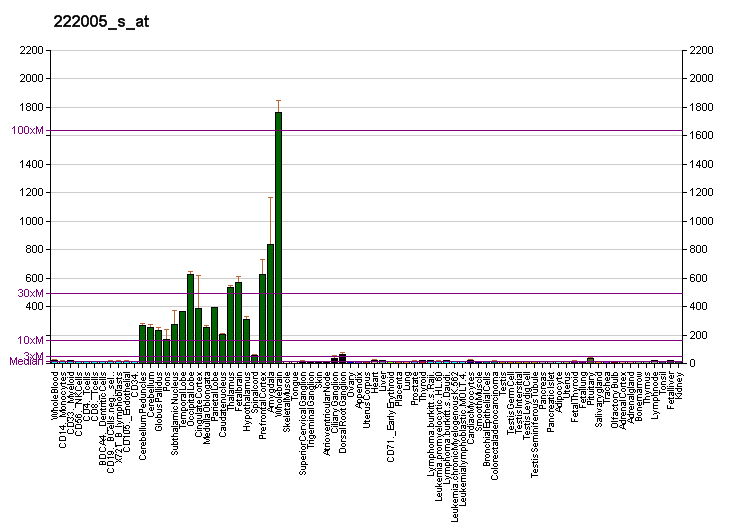
RNA expression pattern
Bgee	Human / Mouse (ortholog); Top expressed in: right frontal lobe; right hemisphere of cerebellum; dorsolateral prefrontal cortex; prefrontal cortex; cingulate gyrus; anterior cingulate cortex; Brodmann area 9; spinal ganglia; amygdala; ganglionic eminence / Top expressed in: perirhinal cortex; entorhinal cortex; central gray substance of midbrain; medial dorsal nucleus; CA3 field; inferior colliculi; subiculum; superior colliculus; primary motor cortex; paraventricular nucleus of hypothalamus; More reference expression data
BioGPS	More reference expression data
Gene ontology
Molecular function	G protein-coupled receptor binding; signal transducer activity; type 1 angiotensin receptor binding; protein binding; GTPase activity; G-protein beta-subunit binding
Cellular component	cell body; plasma membrane; dendrite; membrane; heterotrimeric G-protein complex; postsynaptic density; G-protein beta/gamma-subunit complex
Biological process	positive regulation of cytosolic calcium ion concentration; G protein-coupled receptor signaling pathway; signal transduction
Sources:Amigo / QuickGO
Orthologs
Databases	NCBI: entry; OMA: entry
Species	Human	Mouse
Entrez	2785	14704
Ensembl	ENSG00000162188	ENSMUSG00000071658
UniProt	P63215	P63216
RefSeq (mRNA)	NM_012202	NM_010316
RefSeq (protein)	NP_036334	NP_034446
Location (UCSC)	Chr 11: 62.71 – 62.71 Mb	Chr 19: 8.81 – 8.82 Mb
PubMed search
- Wikidata
View/Edit Human	View/Edit Mouse

Guanine nucleotide-binding protein G(I)/G(S)/G(O) subunit gamma-3 is a protein that in humans is encoded by the GNG3 gene.

G proteins are heterotrimers of alpha, beta, and gamma subunits. Gamma subunits, such as GNG3, contribute to the specificity of the hundreds of receptor signaling pathways involving G proteins (Schwindinger et al., 2004).[supplied by OMIM]
