= GPR149 =

Protein-coding gene in the species Homo sapiens

Identifiers
- Aliases: GPR149, IEDA, PGR10, G protein-coupled receptor 149, R35
- External IDs: MGI: 2443628; GeneCards: GPR149

Gene location (Human)
Chr.	Chromosome 3 (human)
Band	3q25.2	Start	154,334,943 bp
Band	3q25.2	End	154,430,190 bp

Gene location (Mouse)
Chr.	Chromosome 3 (mouse)
Band	3|3 E1	Start	62,436,498 bp
Band	3|3 E1	End	62,512,561 bp
RNA expression pattern
Bgee	Human / Mouse (ortholog); Top expressed in: testicle; nucleus accumbens; caudate nucleus; putamen; pituitary gland; prefrontal cortex; superior frontal gyrus; anterior pituitary; hypothalamus; primary visual cortex / Top expressed in: lumbar spinal ganglion; secondary oocyte; zygote; primary oocyte; ventromedial nucleus; olfactory tubercle; embryo; trigeminal ganglion; embryo; facial motor nucleus; More reference expression data
BioGPS	n/a
Gene ontology
Molecular function	neuropeptide binding; G protein-coupled receptor activity; signal transducer activity; melanin-concentrating hormone receptor activity; peptide binding
Cellular component	integral component of membrane; neuron projection; plasma membrane; integral component of plasma membrane; membrane
Biological process	G protein-coupled receptor signaling pathway, coupled to cyclic nucleotide second messenger; negative regulation of ovulation; G protein-coupled receptor signaling pathway; neuropeptide signaling pathway; preantral ovarian follicle growth; antral ovarian follicle growth; signal transduction; chemical synaptic transmission
Sources:Amigo / QuickGO
Orthologs
Databases	NCBI: entry; OMA: entry
Species	Human	Mouse
Entrez	344758	229357
Ensembl	ENSG00000174948	ENSMUSG00000043441
UniProt	Q86SP6	Q3UVY1
RefSeq (mRNA)	NM_001038705	NM_177346; NM_001356525
RefSeq (protein)	NP_001033794	NP_796320; NP_001343454
Location (UCSC)	Chr 3: 154.33 – 154.43 Mb	Chr 3: 62.44 – 62.51 Mb
PubMed search
- Wikidata
View/Edit Human	View/Edit Mouse

Probable G-protein coupled receptor 149 is a protein that in humans is encoded by the GPR149 gene.
