= GPR142 =

Protein-coding gene in the species Homo sapiens

Identifiers
- Aliases: GPR142, PGR2, G protein-coupled receptor 142, GPRg1b
- External IDs: OMIM: 609046; MGI: 2668437; GeneCards: GPR142

Gene location (Human)
Chr.	Chromosome 17 (human)
Band	17q25.1	Start	74,367,458 bp
Band	17q25.1	End	74,372,600 bp

Gene location (Mouse)
Chr.	Chromosome 11 (mouse)
Band	11|11 E2	Start	114,689,750 bp
Band	11|11 E2	End	114,697,571 bp
RNA expression pattern
Bgee	Human / Mouse (ortholog); Top expressed in: islet of Langerhans; spleen; duodenum; granulocyte; lymph node; gastric mucosa; left uterine tube; right lobe of thyroid gland; appendix; canal of the cervix / Top expressed in: islet of Langerhans; embryo; CA3 field; cochlea; pharynx; cartilage tissue; neck; habenula; peripheral nervous system; medial habenular nucleus; More reference expression data
BioGPS	n/a
Gene ontology
Molecular function	G protein-coupled receptor activity; signal transducer activity
Cellular component	integral component of membrane; cell junction; membrane; plasma membrane; cytosol
Biological process	G protein-coupled receptor signaling pathway; signal transduction
Sources:Amigo / QuickGO
Orthologs
Databases	NCBI: entry; OMA: entry
Species	Human	Mouse
Entrez	350383	217302
Ensembl	ENSG00000257008	ENSMUSG00000034677
UniProt	Q7Z601	Q7TQN9
RefSeq (mRNA)	NM_181790; NM_001331076; NM_001331077	NM_181749; NM_001346772; NM_001379097
RefSeq (protein)	NP_001318005; NP_001318006; NP_861455	NP_001333701; NP_861414; NP_001366026
Location (UCSC)	Chr 17: 74.37 – 74.37 Mb	Chr 11: 114.69 – 114.7 Mb
PubMed search
- Wikidata
View/Edit Human	View/Edit Mouse

Probable G-protein coupled receptor 142 is a protein that in humans is encoded by the GPR142 gene.

GPR142 is a member of the rhodopsin family of G protein-coupled receptors (GPRs) (Fredriksson et al., 2003).[supplied by OMIM]
