= GPR135 =

Protein-coding gene in the species Homo sapiens

Identifiers
- Aliases: GPR135, HUMNPIIY20, G protein-coupled receptor 135
- External IDs: OMIM: 607970; MGI: 2676315; GeneCards: GPR135

Gene location (Human)
Chr.	Chromosome 14 (human)
Band	14q23.1	Start	59,429,022 bp
Band	14q23.1	End	59,465,380 bp

Gene location (Mouse)
Chr.	Chromosome 12 (mouse)
Band	12|12 C3	Start	72,114,750 bp
Band	12|12 C3	End	72,117,899 bp
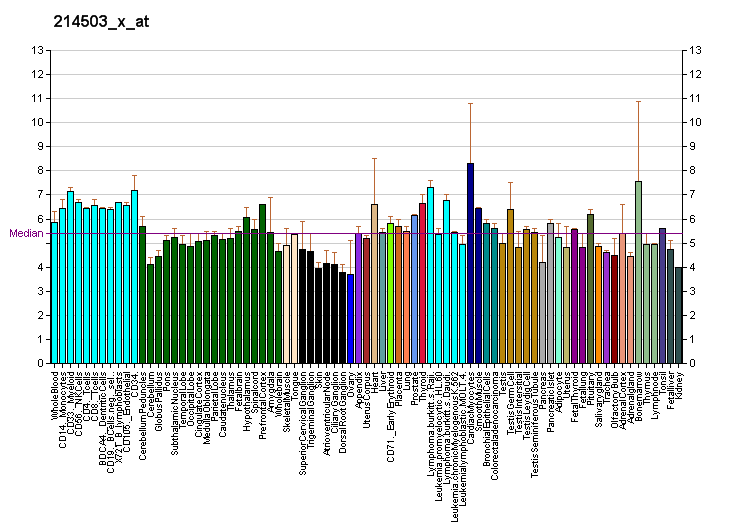

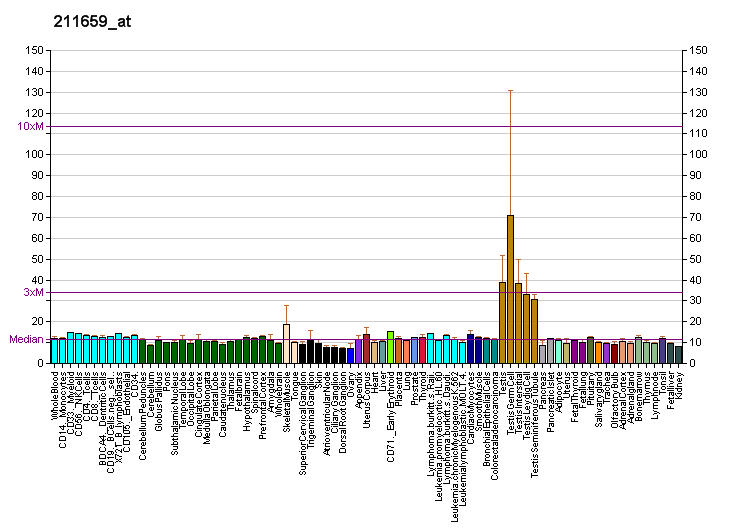

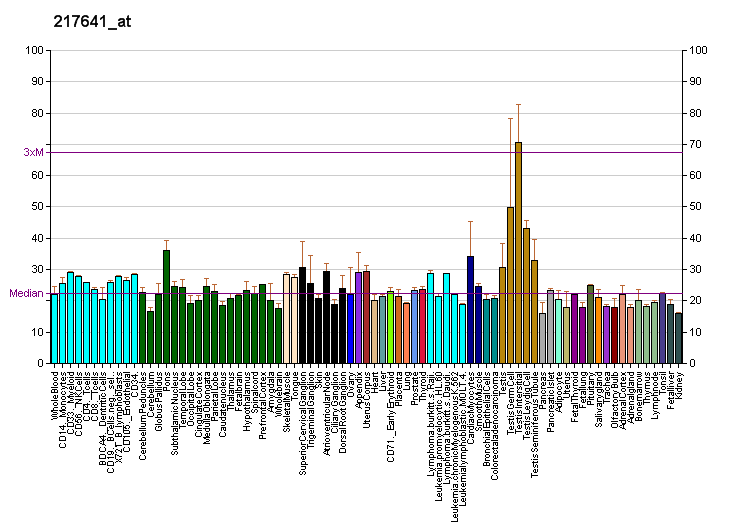
RNA expression pattern
Bgee	Human / Mouse (ortholog); Top expressed in: left testis; right testis; sperm; testicle; right uterine tube; buccal mucosa cell; right coronary artery; ventricular zone; left coronary artery; popliteal artery / Top expressed in: substantia nigra; Region I of hippocampus proper; ventromedial nucleus; paraventricular nucleus of hypothalamus; dorsomedial hypothalamic nucleus; arcuate nucleus; lateral hypothalamus; fossa; lateral septal nucleus; anterior amygdaloid area; More reference expression data
BioGPS	More reference expression data
Gene ontology
Molecular function	G protein-coupled receptor activity; signal transducer activity; protein binding; arrestin family protein binding
Cellular component	integral component of membrane; membrane; plasma membrane; endosome; endosome membrane
Biological process	G protein-coupled receptor signaling pathway; signal transduction
Sources:Amigo / QuickGO
Orthologs
Databases	NCBI: entry; OMA: entry
Species	Human	Mouse
Entrez	64582	238252
Ensembl	ENSG00000181619	ENSMUSG00000043398
UniProt	Q8IZ08	Q7TQP2
RefSeq (mRNA)	NM_022571	NM_181752
RefSeq (protein)	NP_072093	NP_861417
Location (UCSC)	Chr 14: 59.43 – 59.47 Mb	Chr 12: 72.11 – 72.12 Mb
PubMed search
- Wikidata
View/Edit Human	View/Edit Mouse

Probable G-protein coupled receptor 135 is a protein that in humans is encoded by the GPR135 gene.
