= Fat storage-inducing transmembrane protein 1 =

Protein-coding gene in the species Homo sapiens

FITM1

Identifiers
- Aliases: FITM1, FIT1, fat storage inducing transmembrane protein 1
- External IDs: OMIM: 612028; MGI: 1915930; HomoloGene: 41695; GeneCards: FITM1; OMA:FITM1 - orthologs

Gene location (Human)
Chr.	Chromosome 14 (human)
Band	14q12	Start	24,130,659 bp
Band	14q12	End	24,132,849 bp

Gene location (Mouse)
Chr.	Chromosome 14 (mouse)
Band	14|14 C3	Start	55,813,074 bp
Band	14|14 C3	End	55,814,411 bp
RNA expression pattern
Bgee	Human / Mouse (ortholog); Top expressed in: muscle of thigh; apex of heart; gastrocnemius muscle; left ventricle; right auricle; skeletal muscle tissue; right lobe of liver; body of pancreas; spleen; left adrenal gland / Top expressed in: muscle of thigh; temporal muscle; triceps brachii muscle; sternocleidomastoid muscle; extraocular muscle; digastric muscle; interventricular septum; soleus muscle; medial head of gastrocnemius muscle; tibialis anterior muscle; More reference expression data
BioGPS	n/a
Gene ontology
Molecular function	molecular function
Cellular component	integral component of membrane; integral component of endoplasmic reticulum membrane; endoplasmic reticulum; membrane; endoplasmic reticulum membrane
Biological process	lipid storage; positive regulation of sequestering of triglyceride; phospholipid biosynthetic process; lipid droplet organization
Sources:Amigo / QuickGO
Orthologs
Species	Human	Mouse
Entrez	161247	68680
Ensembl	ENSG00000139914	ENSMUSG00000022215
UniProt	A5D6W6	Q91V79
RefSeq (mRNA)	NM_203402	NM_026808
RefSeq (protein)	NP_981947	NP_081084
Location (UCSC)	Chr 14: 24.13 – 24.13 Mb	Chr 14: 55.81 – 55.81 Mb
PubMed search
- Wikidata
View/Edit Human	View/Edit Mouse

Fat storage-inducing transmembrane protein 1 is a protein that in humans is encoded by the FITM1 gene.

== Function ==
FIT1 belongs to an evolutionarily conserved family of proteins involved in fat storage (Kadereit et al., 2008 [PubMed 18160536]).[supplied by OMIM, May 2008].
