= EMID1 =

Protein-coding gene in the species Homo sapiens

Identifiers
- Aliases: EMID1, EMI5, EMU1, EMI domain containing 1
- External IDs: OMIM: 608926; MGI: 2155091; GeneCards: EMID1

Gene location (Human)
Chr.	Chromosome 22 (human)
Band	22q12.2	Start	29,205,896 bp
Band	22q12.2	End	29,259,597 bp

Gene location (Mouse)
Chr.	Chromosome 11 (mouse)
Band	11|11 A1	Start	5,106,265 bp
Band	11|11 A1	End	5,152,257 bp
RNA expression pattern
Bgee	Human / Mouse (ortholog); Top expressed in: ventricular zone; spleen; right adrenal cortex; left adrenal cortex; amygdala; cingulate gyrus; anterior cingulate cortex; ganglionic eminence; right frontal lobe; nucleus accumbens / Top expressed in: transitional epithelium of urinary bladder; medullary collecting duct; otic vesicle; yolk sac; vestibular sensory epithelium; saccule; ascending aorta; barrel cortex; renal corpuscle; aortic valve; More reference expression data
BioGPS	n/a
Orthologs
Databases	NCBI: entry; OMA: entry
Species	Human	Mouse
Entrez	129080	140703
Ensembl	ENSG00000186998	ENSMUSG00000034164
UniProt	Q96A84	Q91VF5
RefSeq (mRNA)	NM_001267895; NM_133455	NM_080595
RefSeq (protein)	NP_001254824; NP_597712	NP_542162; NP_001357929; NP_001357930; NP_001357931; NP_001357932 NP_001357933; NP_001357934
Location (UCSC)	Chr 22: 29.21 – 29.26 Mb	Chr 11: 5.11 – 5.15 Mb
PubMed search
- Wikidata
View/Edit Human	View/Edit Mouse

EMI domain containing protein 1 is a protein that in humans is encoded by the EMID1 gene.
