= GPR33 =

Protein-coding gene in the species Homo sapiens

Identifiers
- Aliases: GPR33, G protein-coupled receptor 33 (gene/pseudogene), G protein-coupled receptor 33
- External IDs: OMIM: 610118; MGI: 1277106; GeneCards: GPR33

Gene location (Human)
Chr.	Chromosome 14 (human)
Band	14q12	Start	31,482,875 bp
Band	14q12	End	31,488,039 bp

Gene location (Mouse)
Chr.	Chromosome 12 (mouse)
Band	12|12 C1	Start	52,069,786 bp
Band	12|12 C1	End	52,074,846 bp
RNA expression pattern
Bgee	Human / Mouse (ortholog); Top expressed in: duodenum; white blood cell; appendix; monocyte; lymph node; tonsil; urinary bladder; left ventricle; salivary gland / Top expressed in: lumbar subsegment of spinal cord; right ventricle; central gray substance of midbrain; nucleus of stria terminalis; sternocleidomastoid muscle; upper arm; triceps brachii muscle; tracheobronchial tree; mucosa of small intestine; tibiofemoral joint; More reference expression data
BioGPS	n/a
Gene ontology
Molecular function	signal transducer activity; complement receptor activity; G protein-coupled receptor activity
Cellular component	integral component of membrane; plasma membrane; membrane; integral component of plasma membrane
Biological process	G protein-coupled receptor signaling pathway; signal transduction; complement receptor mediated signaling pathway; inflammatory response; phospholipase C-activating G protein-coupled receptor signaling pathway; positive regulation of cytosolic calcium ion concentration; leukocyte migration; cell chemotaxis
Sources:Amigo / QuickGO
Orthologs
Databases	NCBI: entry; OMA: entry
Species	Human	Mouse
Entrez	2856	14762
Ensembl	ENSG00000214943	ENSMUSG00000035148
UniProt	Q49SQ1	O88416
RefSeq (mRNA)	NM_001197184	NM_008159
RefSeq (protein)	NP_001184113; NP_001184113.2	NP_032185
Location (UCSC)	Chr 14: 31.48 – 31.49 Mb	Chr 12: 52.07 – 52.07 Mb
PubMed search
- Wikidata
View/Edit Human	View/Edit Mouse

Probable G-protein coupled receptor 33 is a protein that in humans is encoded by the GPR33 gene.
