= GNG5 =

Protein-coding gene in humans

Identifiers
- Aliases: GNG5, G protein subunit gamma 5
- External IDs: OMIM: 600874; MGI: 3783217; GeneCards: GNG5

Gene location (Human)
Chr.	Chromosome 1 (human)
Band	1p22.3	Start	84,498,323 bp
Band	1p22.3	End	84,506,581 bp
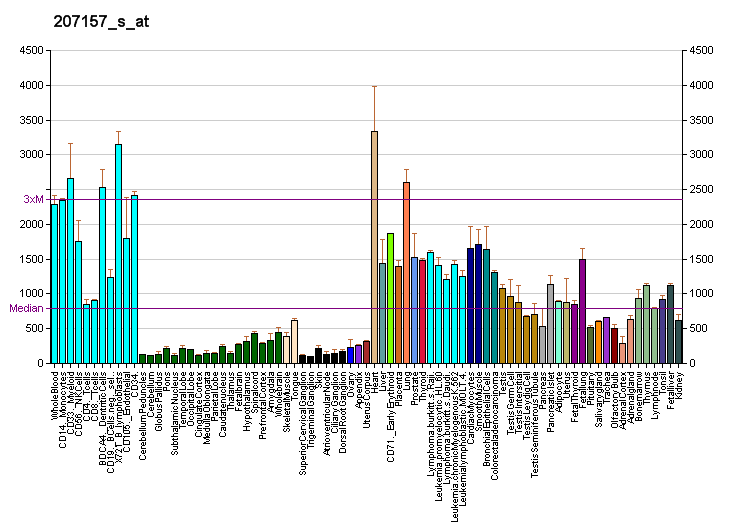
RNA expression pattern
Bgee	Human / Mouse (ortholog); Top expressed in: mucosa of transverse colon; left ventricle; right auricle of heart; apex of heart; muscle of thigh; right lung; ventricular zone; upper lobe of left lung; olfactory zone of nasal mucosa; granulocyte / n/a; More reference expression data
BioGPS	More reference expression data
Gene ontology
Molecular function	PDZ domain binding; protein binding; GTPase activity; signal transducer activity; G-protein beta-subunit binding
Cellular component	extracellular exosome; mitochondrion; membrane; heterotrimeric G-protein complex; plasma membrane; G-protein beta/gamma-subunit complex
Biological process	positive regulation of neural precursor cell proliferation; positive regulation of secondary heart field cardioblast proliferation; cellular response to glucagon stimulus; signal transduction; G protein-coupled receptor signaling pathway
Sources:Amigo / QuickGO
Orthologs
Databases	NCBI: entry; OMA: entry
Species	Human	Mouse
Entrez	2787	100043507
Ensembl	ENSG00000174021	n/a
UniProt	P63218	Q80SZ7
RefSeq (mRNA)	NM_005274	n/a
RefSeq (protein)	NP_005265	NP_034448
Location (UCSC)	Chr 1: 84.5 – 84.51 Mb	n/a
PubMed search
- Wikidata
View/Edit Human	View/Edit Mouse

Guanine nucleotide-binding protein G(I)/G(S)/G(O) subunit gamma-5 is a protein that in humans is encoded by the GNG5 gene.
