= FXYD family =

ATP1G1/PLM/MAT8 family
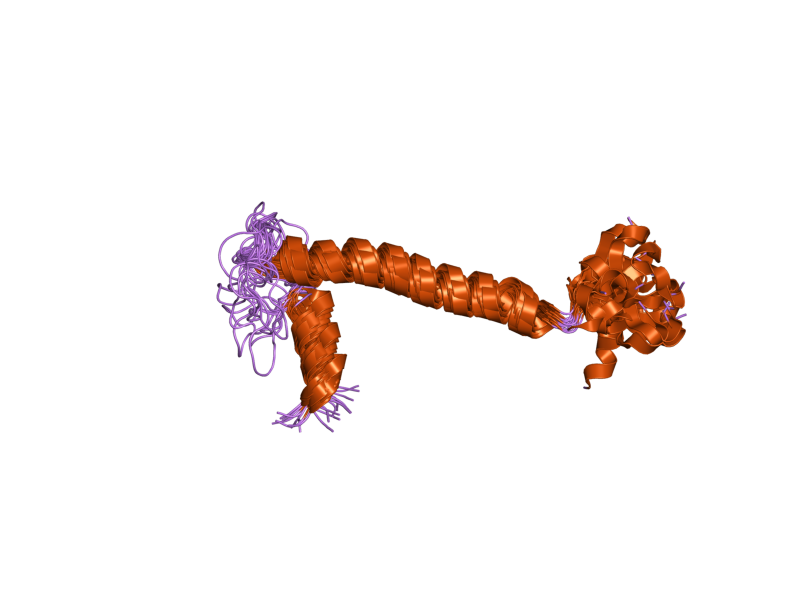
- Structure of Na,K-ATPase regulatory protein FXYD1.

Identifiers
- Symbol: ATP1G1_PLM_MAT8
- Pfam: PF02038
- InterPro: IPR000272
- PROSITE: PS01310
- TCDB: 1.A.27
- OPM superfamily: 62
- OPM protein: 2jo1
- Membranome: 382
Available protein structures:
- PDB: IPR000272 PF02038 (ECOD; PDBsum)
- AlphaFold: IPR000272; PF02038

The FXYD protein family is a family of small membrane proteins that share a 35-amino acid signature sequence domain, beginning with the amino acid sequence PFXYD and containing 7 invariant and 6 highly conserved amino acids. The approved human gene nomenclature for the family is FXYD-domain containing ion transport regulator.

It contains at least seven members in mammals. Two other family members that are not obvious orthologs of any identified mammalian FXYD protein exist in zebrafish. All these proteins share a signature sequence of six conserved amino acids comprising the FXYD motif in the NH2-terminus, and two glycines and one serine residue in the transmembrane domain. FXYD proteins are widely distributed in mammalian tissues with prominent expression in tissues that perform fluid and solute transport or that are electrically excitable.

Initial functional characterization suggested that FXYD proteins act as channels or as modulators of ion channels. However, studies have revealed that most FXYD proteins have another specific function and act as tissue-specific regulatory subunits of the Na,K-ATPase. Each of these auxiliary subunits produces a distinct functional effect on the transport characteristics of the Na,K-ATPase that is adjusted to the specific functional demands of the tissue in which the FXYD protein is expressed. FXYD proteins appear to preferentially associate with Na,K-ATPase alpha1-beta isozymes, and affect their function in a way that render them operationally complementary or supplementary to coexisting isozymes.

== Human proteins containing this domain ==
FXYD1; FXYD2; FXYD3; FXYD4; FXYD5; FXYD6; FXYD7; FXYD8; KCT1;
