= Chromosome 5 open reading frame 15 =

Human gene

C5orf15

Identifiers
- Aliases: C5orf15, KCT2, HTGN29, chromosome 5 open reading frame 15
- External IDs: MGI: 2654705; HomoloGene: 10620; GeneCards: C5orf15; OMA:C5orf15 - orthologs

Gene location (Human)
Chr.	Chromosome 5 (human)
Band	5q31.1	Start	133,955,510 bp
Band	5q31.1	End	133,968,674 bp

Gene location (Mouse)
Chr.	Chromosome 11 (mouse)
Band	11|11 B1.3	Start	52,287,255 bp
Band	11|11 B1.3	End	52,299,555 bp
RNA expression pattern
Bgee	Human / Mouse (ortholog); Top expressed in: tibia; bronchial epithelial cell; germinal epithelium; palpebral conjunctiva; epithelium of nasopharynx; Epithelium of choroid plexus; mucosa of paranasal sinus; parietal pleura; cartilage tissue; visceral pleura / Top expressed in: stroma of bone marrow; ascending aorta; aortic valve; atrium; calvaria; Gonadal ridge; choroid plexus of fourth ventricle; granulocyte; umbilical cord; right kidney; More reference expression data
BioGPS	n/a
Orthologs
Species	Human	Mouse
Entrez	56951	213673
Ensembl	ENSG00000113583	ENSMUSG00000036275
UniProt	Q8NC54	Q8K201
RefSeq (mRNA)	NM_020199	NM_153117
RefSeq (protein)	NP_064584	NP_694757
Location (UCSC)	Chr 5: 133.96 – 133.97 Mb	Chr 11: 52.29 – 52.3 Mb
PubMed search
- Wikidata
View/Edit Human	View/Edit Mouse

Chromosome 5 open reading frame 15 (C5orf15) is a protein which in humans is encoded by the C5orf15 gene. It can also be referred to as keratinocyte-associated transmembrane protein 2 precursor (KCT2) or HTGN29, but is most commonly referred to as C5orf15. The C5orf15 protein is a Single-pass membrane protein.

== Gene ==
In the human genome, C5orf15 is located on chromosome 5, specifically at 5q31.1 on the negative strand. C5orf15 spans 2,188 base pairs, which includes three exons. The C5orf15 gene has one protein-coding sequence.

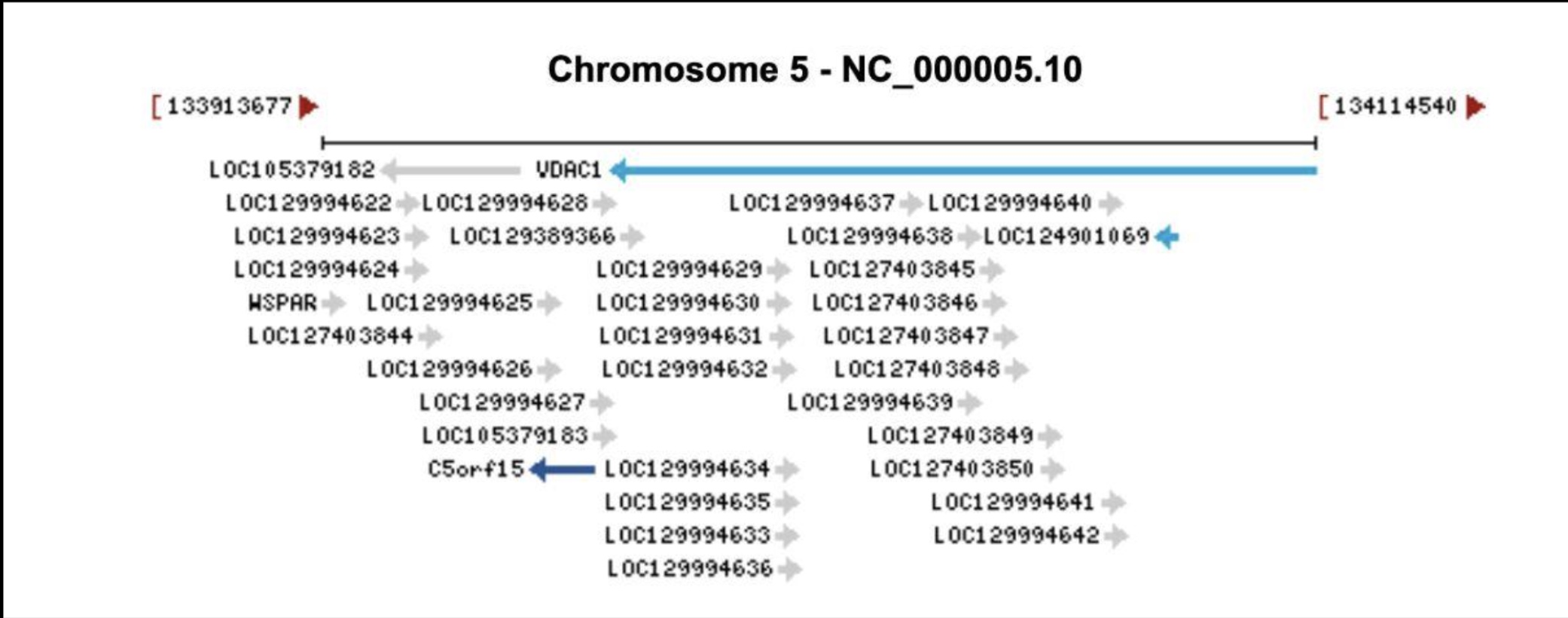
C5orf15 gene neighborhood, adopted from NCBI-Gene of C5orf15.

== mRNA ==
C5orf15 mRNA has a single sequence variant that includes 13,116 nucleotides. The 5' untranslated region (UTR) is short compared to the coding sequence and much shorter than the 3' untranslated region. The 5' UTR contains 44 nucleotides, while the 3' UTR contains 1,352 nucleotides.

=== Conceptual translation ===
The shown conceptual translation includes the coding sequence and protein sequence for C5orf15. It is annotated with key regions, post-translational modifications, conserved amino acids, and variants.

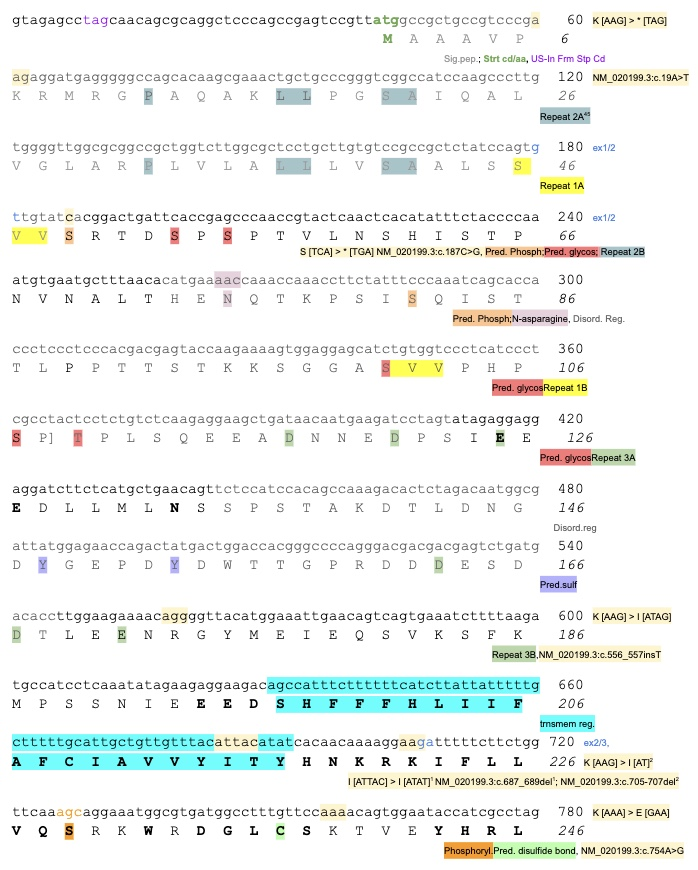
Conceptual translation of C5orf15. Contains post-translation modifications, key regions, variations, and conserved amino acids. (1/2)

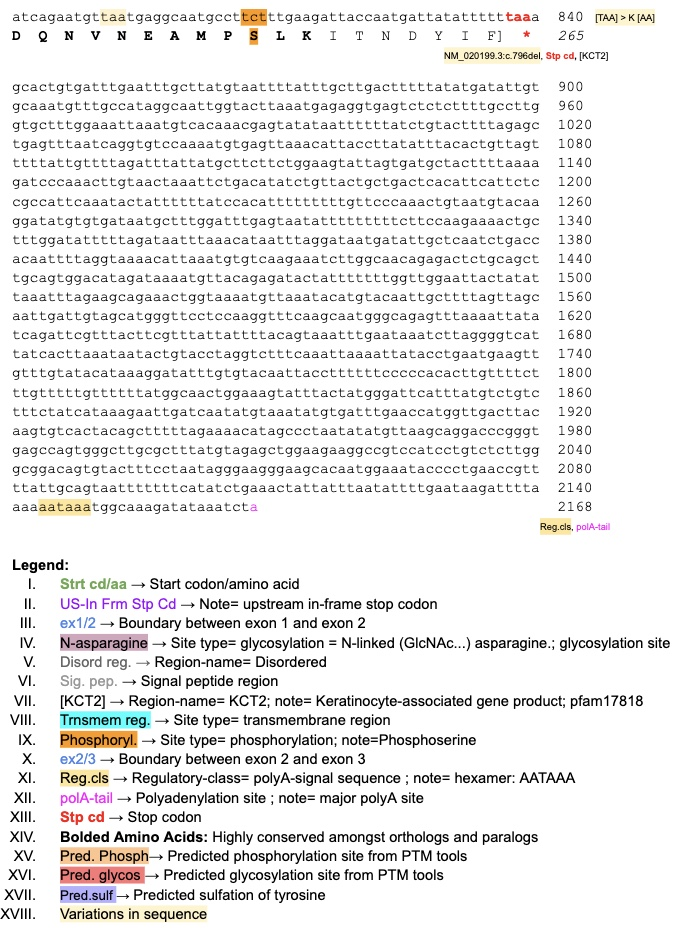
Conceptual translation of C5orf15. Contains post-translation modifications, key regions, variations, and conserved amino acids. (2/2)

== Protein ==
C5orf15 protein (also referred to as keratinocyte-associated transmembrane protein 2 precursor) is composed of 265 amino acids, which, in humans, has one isoform (Ref: NP_064584.1). The function of the C5orf15 protein is not yet well understood in the scientific community. The C5orf15 protein contains regions of phosphorylation, glycosylation, a transmembrane region, and two disordered regions.

=== Composition ===
The theoretical isoelectric point was found to be 4.93. The compositional analysis showed a lower concentration of Glycine (G) in C5orf15 than typical human proteins. A high-scoring transmembrane region was identified from 199-215, with a score of 54.0. A hydrophobic region was identified along with the transmembrane segments, with a score of 26.0. The C5orf15 protein has a molecular weight of approximately 29 kDa.

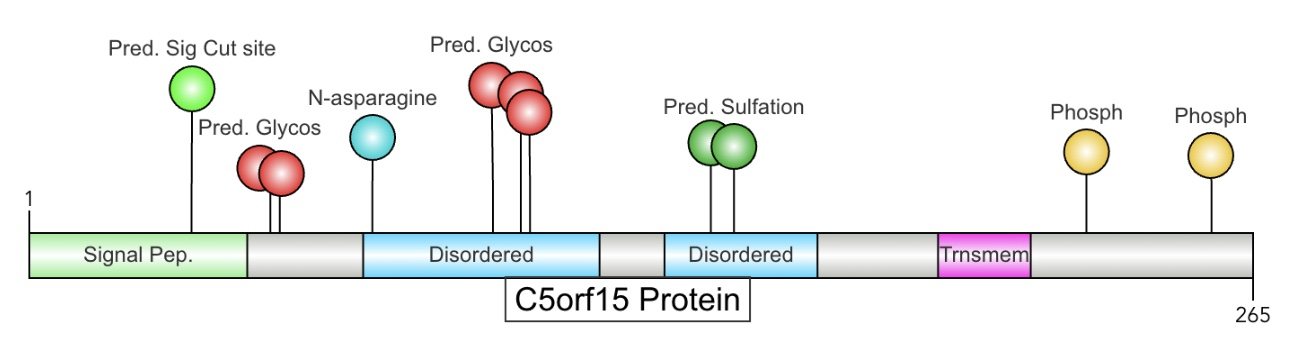
Schematic diagram of C5orf15 protein, containing post-translational modifications listed on NCBI-gene and predicted sites. The protein contains a signal peptide, two disordered regions, predicted and known phosphorylation sites, an N-asparagine, predicted sulfations, glycosylations, and a signal peptide cut site.

=== Structure ===
The structure of C5orf15 is composed of many random coiled regions and some alpha helices. The Alpha Fold structure did not separate extracellular and cytoplasmic regions of the protein, while I-Tasser predictions did.

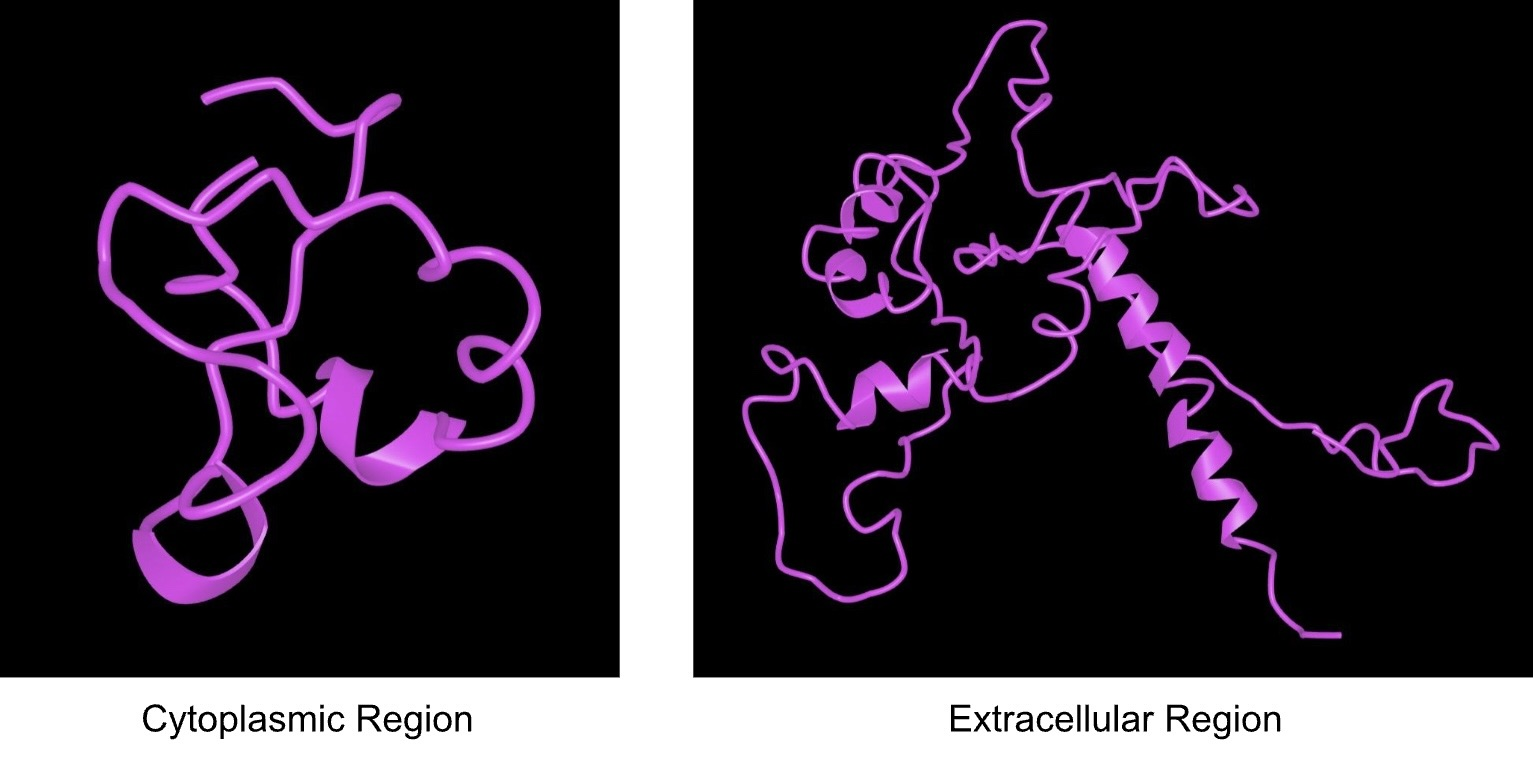
I-Tasser separated the cytoplasmic and extracellular regions of C5orf15, which includes one transmembrane segment. Both regions contain many random free random coils and alpha helices.

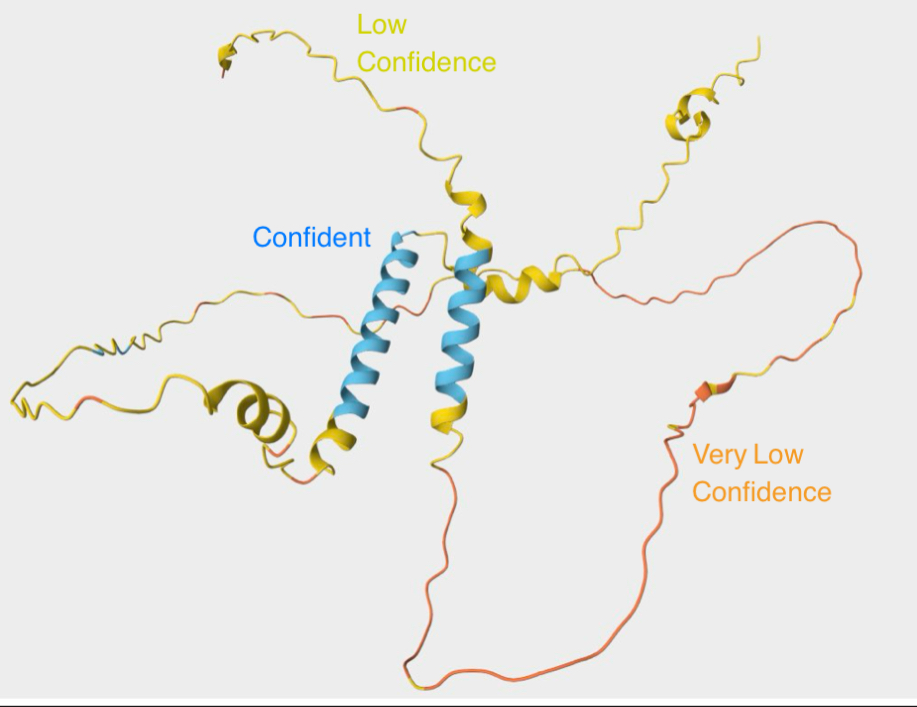
Predicted tertiary structure of C5orf15 protein. Image is adopted and edited from Alpha-Fold.

=== Post-Translational Modifications ===
C5orf15 undergoes multiple post-translational modifications, which include: phosphorylations and glycosylations. Predicted post-translational modifications from Expasy include: 16 O-linked glycosylations, 2 tyrosine sulfations, a signal peptide cleavage site at 36-37, and 15 functional motifs.

Type	Possible C5orf15 Significance
O-linked glycosylation	Suggests highly glycosylated regions may be extracellular and could be important for protein interactions.
N-linked glycosylation	Possibly assists in the folding of the N-terminus region and allows for secretion.
Signal peptide cleavage site	Likely to be secreted and end up in the extracellular region or outside another organelle.
O-GalNAc (mucin type) glycosylation	Dense cluster from AA 53–109 possibly indicates importance in cell-signaling or a structural role.
Tyrosine Sulfation	May function in signaling or adhesion with two sulfated residues.

=== Protein interactions ===
C5orf15 has multiple protein interactions with human and viral proteins. These are highlighted below:

==== Human proteins ====
- EFCAB8 (EF-hand calcium-binding domain-containing protein 8)
- ZCCHC9 (Zinc finger CCHC domain-containing protein 9)
- FXYD5 (FXYD domain-containing ion transport regulator 5)
- TXNDC12 (Thioredoxin domain-containing protein 12)
- TMEM123 (Porimin)
- ZNF17 (Zinc finger protein 17)
- PHYKPL (5-phosphohydroxy-L-lysinephospho-lyase)
- TMEM159 (Promethin)
- KCNE3 (Potassium Voltage-Gated Channel Subfamily E Regulatory Subunit 3)
- KRAS (V-Ki-Ras2 Kirsten Rat SarcomaViral Oncogene Homolog)

==== Viral proteins ====
- E5 Human Papillomavirus type 18
- Ap3a_sars2 SARS-CoV-2
- LMP2 Epstein-Barr virus (strain B95-8)
- NS3 Human coronavirus NL63

== Expression and localization ==
=== Tissue expression ===
The C5orf15 gene is ubiquitously expressed at varying high levels in human tissue, with a 4 fold difference between the lowest and highest RPKM expression values. Expression has been classified under Cluster 1 Liver and Kidney-Metabolism. Highest expression was observed in kidney, urinary bladder, adrenal, and placenta.

=== Localization ===
C5orf15 protein is predicted to be localized to the Golgi apparatus. Fluorescent antibody staining of C5orf15 showed clear localization to the golgi apparatus. C5orf15 can be used as a possible antibody stain for the Golgi apparatus. The Golgi apparatus is an important component of the cell that receives signals from the endoplasmic reticulum and modifies proteins for further secretion, acting as a central processing region within the cell.

== Homology ==
=== Paralogs ===
The C5orf15 Protein has one identified paralog: the trans-golgi network integral membrane protein 2 (TGOLN2), which has six isoforms that appeared when the C5orf15 Protein sequence was sequenced against to Homo sapiens using BLAST technology. TGOLN2 is involved in regulating membrane traffic to and from the trans-Golgi network.

Paralogs
	Accession Number	Chromosomal Location	Protein Length	Identity to Human C5orf15	E-Value
TGOLN2 Isoform 1	NP_006455.2	2p11.2	437 aa	43%	1.0^{-9}

=== Orthologs ===
The human C5orf15 protein has orthologs in vertebrates dating back to jawless fish, but no further orthologs were found in invertebrates, such as sea urchins, lancelets, and tunicates. Orthologs were present in the classifications of mammalia, aves, reptilia, amphibia, and bony, cartilaginous, and jawless fish.

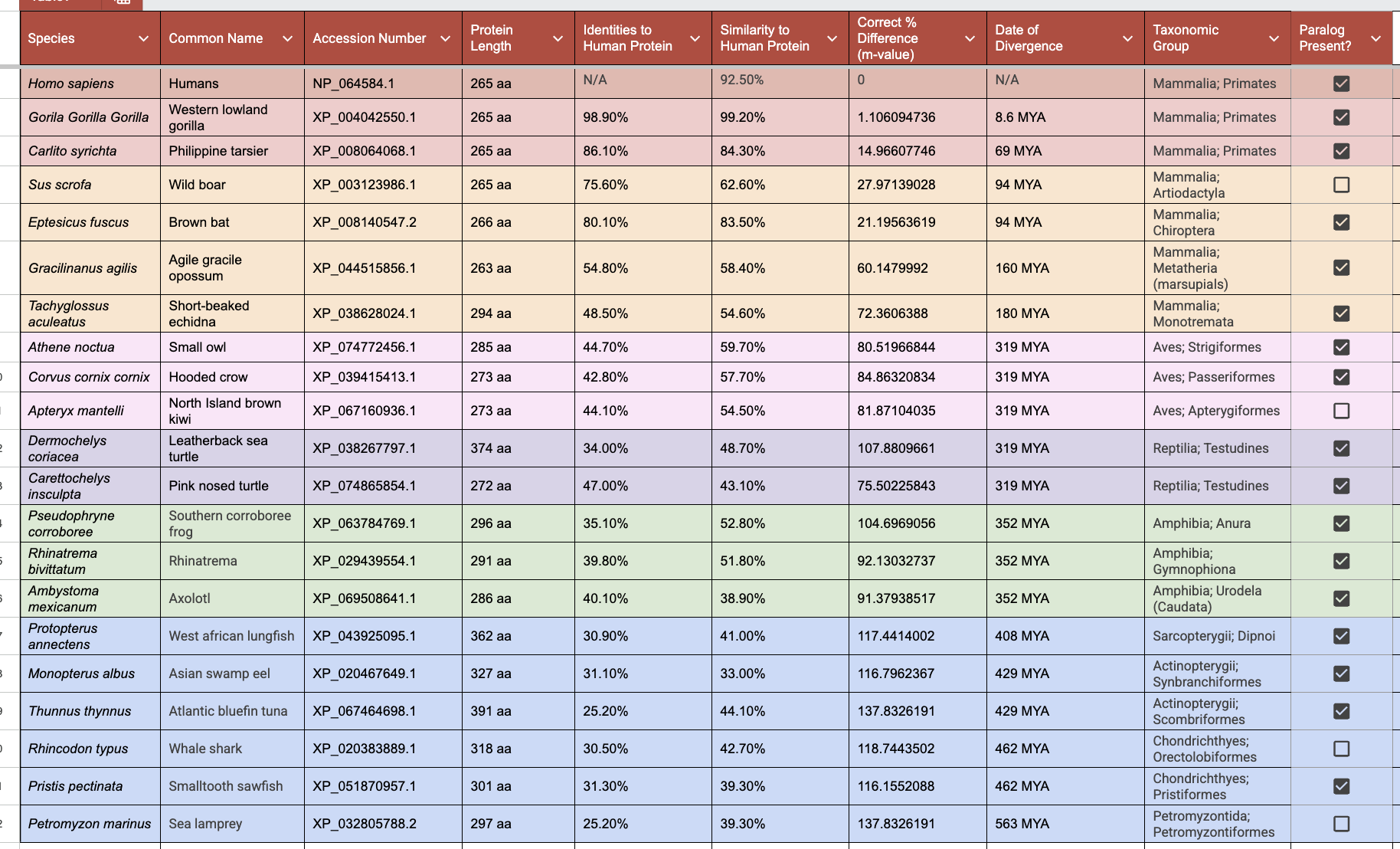
Human C5orf15 Protein and orthologs found in 21 species, including mammalia, aves, reptilia, amphibia, and bony, cartilaginous, and jawless fish.

=== Evolutionary divergence ===
The C5orf15 protein evolution scatter plot displays the relationship between the approximate divergence time (in millions of years ago) and the corrected percent divergence (m) for each species' orthologous protein compared to the human protein. Reference lines for fibrinogen alpha, hemoglobin subunit alpha, and cytochrome c shows the relative evolutionary speed of C5orf15. The C5orf15 protein evolves faster than all three reference sequences.

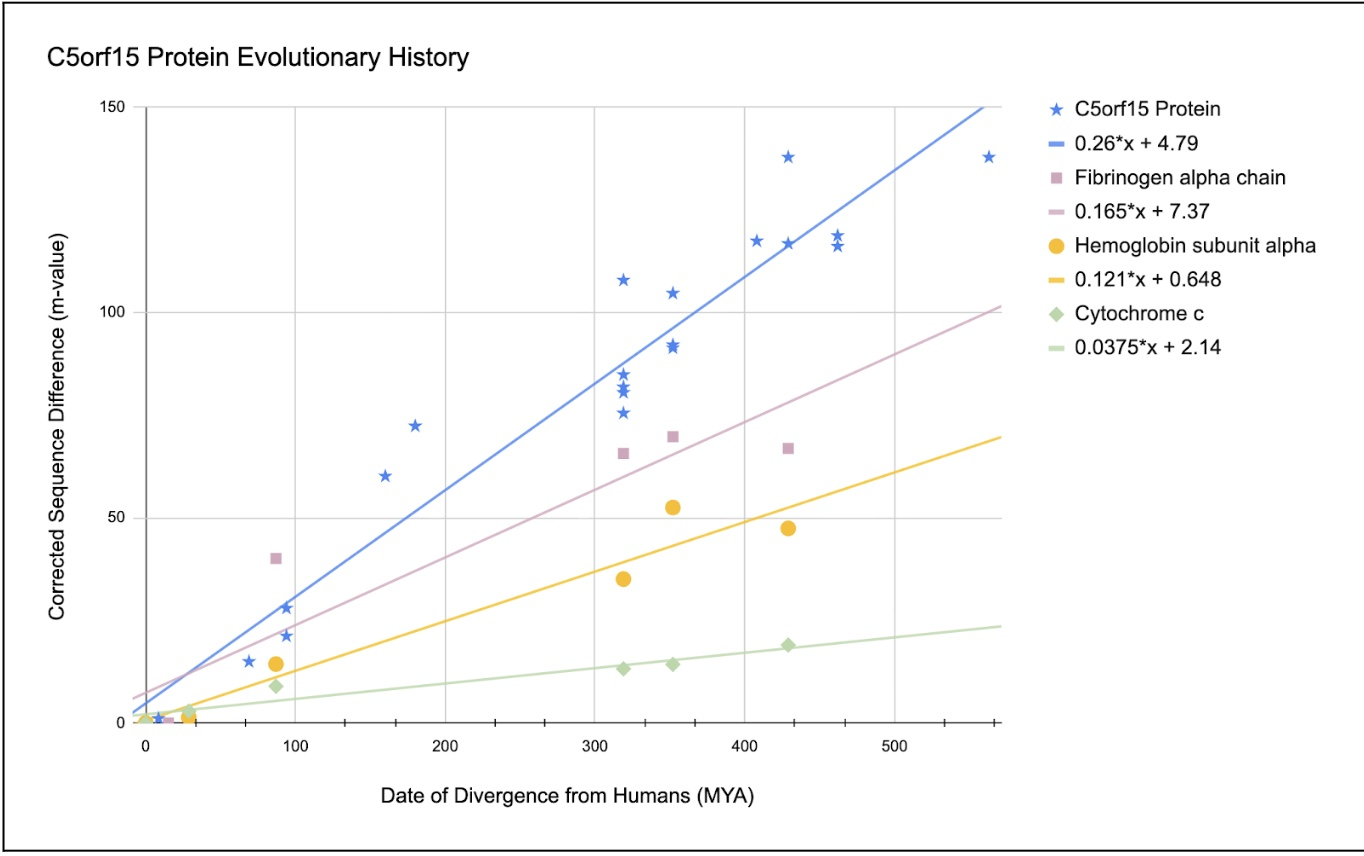
Corrected sequence difference (m-value) is plotted against the date of species divergence from humans (MYA) for C5orf15 and three reference proteins: fibrinogen alpha chain, hemoglobin subunit alpha, and cytochrome c. The slopes of the regression lines represent the relative rates of protein evolution, with C5orf15 showing the fastest rate of sequence change

=== Multiple sequence alignment ===
Two multiple sequence alignments show high conservation of the C-terminus region of the C5orf15 protein.

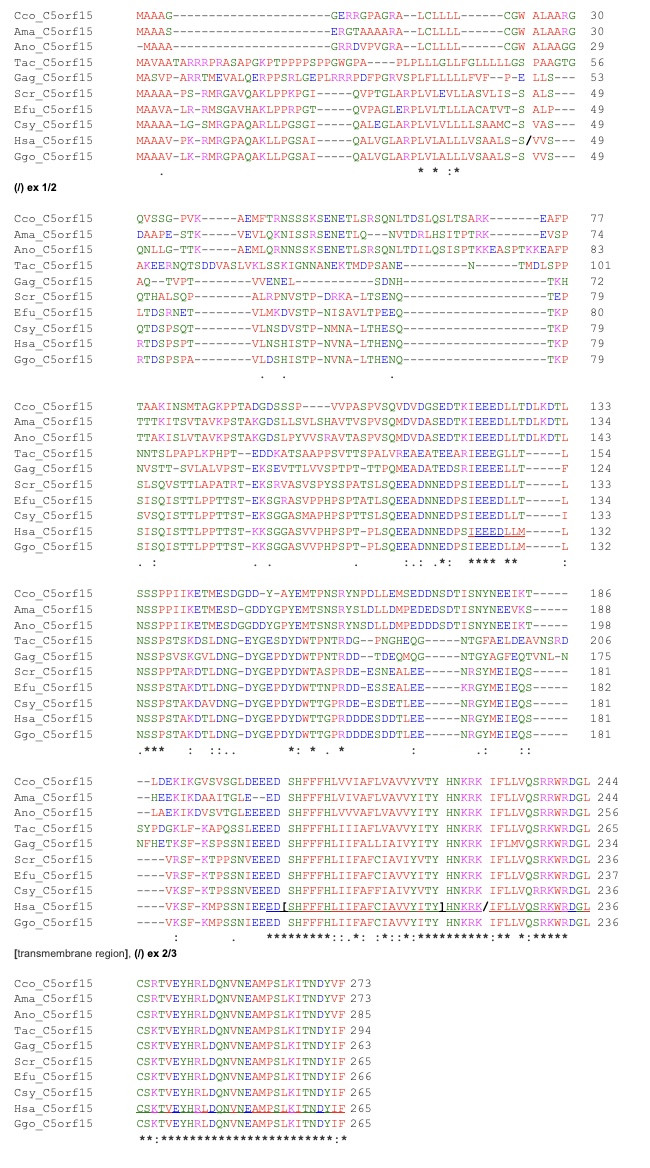
Multiple sequence alignment containing closely related orthologs to C5orf15 (sequences with <50% identity). Stars indicate perfectly matched amino acids and dots indicate similar amino acids.

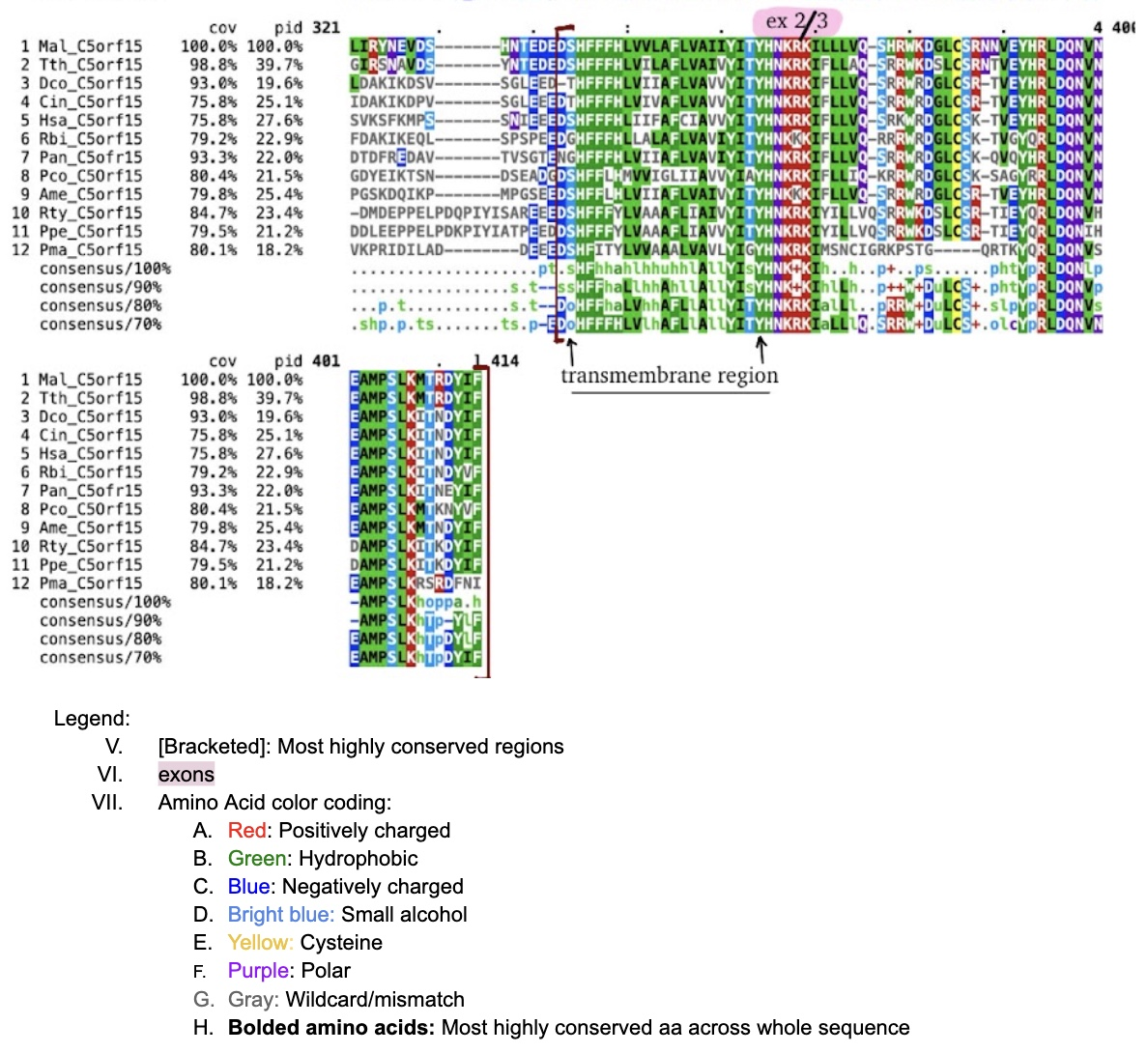
C-terminus multiple sequence alignment of C5orf15 and distant orthologs (less than 50% identity). Legend is included in the image for color-coding and annotations were included to show key regions.

== Clinical significance ==
C5orf15 is found to have a two-fold increase of activity when the β-catenin gene within BxPC-3 cells is disrupted. This is thought to be a product of reduced cell to cell signaling pathways in BxPC-3 cells when the WNT signaling protein was fully deficient of the β-catenin gene.

C5orf15 was correlated with one of three structural aberrations found in 8% of the genomic profiles of acral, mucosal, and vulvovaginal melanomas. Specifically, a fusion was observed between C5orf15 and Ras gene in acral melanomas.

Through GEPIA, an analytical genomic tool, elevated expression of C5orf15 was identified in tumor tissues compared to normal tissues. A higher expression of C5orf15 was related to worse survival outcomes in head and neck squamous cell carcinoma patients. The C5orf15 gene has not been identified to be significantly related to risk-prone immune cell types.
