= Joseph Randall Moorman =

American Physician-Scientist

Joseph Randall Moorman (born April 4, 1953) is an American physician-scientist. He is bicentennial Professor of Advanced Medical Analytics at the University of Virginia School of Medicine.

== Early life and education ==
Moorman is the younger son of Ruth, classicist and professor at the University of Southern Mississippi, and Charles W. Moorman III, medievalist and dean at the University of Southern Mississippi. His brother is former Norfolk Southern and Amtrak CEO Charles Moorman.

Moorman grew up in Hattiesburg, Mississippi. He received his undergraduate degree from the University of Mississippi and his M.D. from University of Mississippi School of Medicine. In 1978, Moorman began his medical internship at Duke University Medical Center, where he served as Chief Resident from 1982-1983 and Cardiology Fellow from 1983-1985. He then finished his post-doctoral research training in membrane biophysics and molecular electrophysiology at Baylor University.

== Career and research ==
From 1985-1990, Moorman was Assistant Professor of Medicine at the University of Texas Medical Branch and worked in the laboratory of Arthur M. Brown at Baylor College of Medicine.

In 1990, he joined the faculty of the University of Virginia School of Medicine.

From 2014 to 2019, he was Editor-in-Chief of Physiological Measurement.

From 2014 to 2021, he was Chief Medical Officer of AMP3D (Advanced Medical Predictive Devices, Diagnostics, and Displays) before the company's acquisition by Nihon Kohden.

In 2014, he and DE Lake were named Edlich-Henderson Innovators of the Year by the University of Virginia Licensing and Ventures Group.

In 2017, he was keynote speaker for the Association for the Advancement of Medical Instrumentation Annual Conference.

== Scientific contributions ==
=== Molecular electrophysiology of ion channels ===
While at Baylor College of Medicine, Moorman studied the biophysical properties of cloned ion channel proteins expressed in heterologous systems.

At the University of Virginia, Moorman and coworkers discovered a unique channel activity for the molecule phospholemman (PLM, also FXYD1).

=== Entropy estimation in clinical time series ===
In 2000, Moorman and JS Richman introduced sample entropy as a measure of complexity in dynamical systems. This method has been successfully used to test for non-linear dynamics and temporal predictability in many systems. In 2011, he and DE Lake developed the coefficient of sample entropy for use in detecting atrial fibrillation.

=== Early detection of subacute potentially catastrophic illnesses ===
In 2001, he and MP Griffin demonstrated unique changes in heart rate characteristics (HRC) prior to the diagnosis of sepsis in premature infants. They and their coworkers devised the HRC Index, the relative risk of illness in the next 24 hours, and showed 22% relative reduction in death rates in one of the largest randomized trials in neonatology. This work was the first effective use of Big Data and Machine Learning to save lives, and was recognized as one of the top 12 scientific discoveries in the past 50 years at the University of Virginia.

Moorman and coworkers went on to develop and validate multiple Machine Learning models for early detection of illness throughout the hospital. Advanced Medical Predictive Devices, Diagnostics and Devices (AMP3D), a Charlottesville, VA, small business, licensed the intellectual property from the University of Virginia Licensing and Ventures Group, developed and implemented the Continuous Monitoring of Event Trajectories (CoMET) display, and was acquired in 2021 by Nihon Kohden Digital Health Solutions in Irvine, CA, a subsidiary of Nihon Kohden Corporation, Japan-based maker of medical devices.

== Published works ==
According to ResearchGate, Moorman has written and co-written 229 peer-reviewed publications.
