= FXYD5 =

Protein-coding gene in the species Homo sapiens

Identifiers
- Aliases: FXYD5, DYSAD, IWU1, KCT1, OIT2, PRO6241, RIC, HSPC113, FXYD domain containing ion transport regulator 5
- External IDs: OMIM: 606669; MGI: 1201785; GeneCards: FXYD5

Gene location (Human)
| Chr. | Chromosome 19 (human) |
| Band | 19q13.12 | Start | 35,154,730 bp |
| Band | 19q13.12 | End | 35,169,881 bp |

Gene location (Mouse)
| Chr. | Chromosome 7 (mouse) |
| Band | 7|7 B1 | Start | 30,732,147 bp |
| Band | 7|7 B1 | End | 30,741,906 bp |
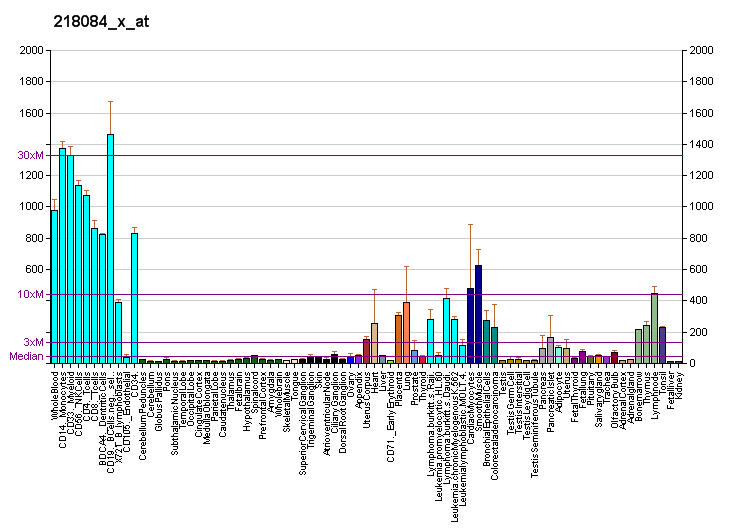
RNA expression pattern
| Bgee | Human / Mouse (ortholog); Top expressed in: granulocyte; monocyte; stromal cell of endometrium; ectocervix; spleen; right lung; ascending aorta; Descending thoracic aorta; canal of the cervix; right coronary artery / Top expressed in: granulocyte; tibiofemoral joint; ankle; blood; endothelial cell of lymphatic vessel; gastrula; ankle joint; thymus; decidua; spleen; More reference expression data |
| BioGPS | More reference expression data |
Gene ontology
| Molecular function | actin binding; ion channel activity; sodium channel regulator activity; cadherin binding; protein binding; ion channel regulator activity |
| Cellular component | integral component of membrane; integral component of plasma membrane; membrane |
| Biological process | negative regulation of calcium-dependent cell-cell adhesion; ion transmembrane transport; microvillus assembly; ion transport; regulation of sodium ion transmembrane transporter activity; regulation of ion transport |
Sources:Amigo / QuickGO
Orthologs
| Databases | NCBI: entry; OMA: entry |
| Species | Human | Mouse |
| Entrez | 53827 | 18301 |
| Ensembl | ENSG00000089327 | ENSMUSG00000009687 |
| UniProt | Q96DB9 | P97808 |
| RefSeq (mRNA) | NM_001164605; NM_014164; NM_144779; NM_001320912; NM_001320913 | NM_001111073; NM_001287213; NM_001287217; NM_008761 |
| RefSeq (protein) | NP_001158077; NP_001307841; NP_001307842; NP_054883; NP_659003 | NP_001104543; NP_001274142; NP_001274146; NP_032787 |
| Location (UCSC) | Chr 19: 35.15 – 35.17 Mb | Chr 7: 30.73 – 30.74 Mb |
| PubMed search |
- Wikidata
| View/Edit Human | View/Edit Mouse |

FXYD domain-containing ion transport regulator 5 also named dysadherin (human) or RIC (mouse) is a protein that in humans is encoded by the FXYD5 gene.

== Function ==
This gene encodes a member of a family of small membrane proteins that share a 35-amino acid signature sequence domain, beginning with the sequence PFXYD and containing 7 invariant and 6 highly conserved amino acids. The approved human gene nomenclature for the family is FXYD-domain containing ion transport regulator. Mouse FXYD5 has been termed RIC (Related to Ion Channel). FXYD2, also known as the gamma subunit of the Na,K-ATPase, regulates the properties of that enzyme. FXYD1 (phospholemman), FXYD2 (gamma), FXYD3 (MAT-8), FXYD4 (CHIF), and FXYD5 (RIC) have been shown to induce channel activity in experimental expression systems. Transmembrane topology has been established for two family members (FXYD1 and FXYD2), with the N-terminus extracellular and the C-terminus on the cytoplasmic side of the membrane. This gene product, FXYD5, has not been characterized as a protein. Two transcript variants have been found for this gene, and they are both predicted to encode the same protein.

Dysadherin is the gamma5 subunit of the human Na,K-ATPase. Of all the FXYD members, dysadherin is the only member that has a large extracellular sequence of 140 amino acids. Dysadherin has been observed to be over-expressed on the surface of cells that have down regulated levels of surface E-cadherin. CCL2 (bone homing cytokine)is a protein that is highly affected by silencing dysadherin expression. Dysadherin interferes with cell adhesion via beta1 subunit interactions. Dysadherin is a target for an extracellular antibody drug conjugate where the antibody to dysadherin is attached to a cardiac glycoside.

== Clinical significance ==
Dysadherin has been found to be a marker for metastatic cancers and found up-regulated in multiple cancer types.
