= FXYD6 =

Identifiers
- Aliases: FXYD6, FXYD domain containing ion transport regulator 6
- External IDs: OMIM: 606683; MGI: 1890226; GeneCards: FXYD6

Gene location (Human)
Chr.	Chromosome 11 (human)
Band	11q23.3	Start	117,836,976 bp
Band	11q23.3	End	117,877,486 bp

Gene location (Mouse)
Chr.	Chromosome 9 (mouse)
Band	9|9 A5.2	Start	45,281,483 bp
Band	9|9 A5.2	End	45,307,457 bp
RNA expression pattern
Bgee	Human / Mouse (ortholog); Top expressed in: prefrontal cortex; ganglionic eminence; ventricular zone; right frontal lobe; right hemisphere of cerebellum; body of uterus; anterior cingulate cortex; dorsolateral prefrontal cortex; Brodmann area 9; orbitofrontal cortex / Top expressed in: extraocular muscle; lip; vestibular membrane of cochlear duct; dentate gyrus of hippocampal formation granule cell; sciatic nerve; ankle; adrenal gland; ankle joint; utricle; digastric muscle; More reference expression data
BioGPS	n/a
Gene ontology
Molecular function	ion channel activity; protein binding; sodium channel regulator activity; molecular function; ion channel regulator activity
Cellular component	integral component of membrane; plasma membrane; membrane; integral component of plasma membrane; glutamatergic synapse; integral component of postsynaptic membrane; integral component of presynaptic membrane
Biological process	ion transport; regulation of sodium ion transmembrane transporter activity; biological process; ion transmembrane transport; regulation of ion transport; regulation of cardiac conduction
Sources:Amigo / QuickGO
Orthologs
Databases	NCBI: entry; OMA: entry
Species	Human	Mouse
Entrez	53826	59095
Ensembl	ENSG00000137726	ENSMUSG00000066705
UniProt	Q9H0Q3	Q9D164
RefSeq (mRNA)	NM_022003; NM_001164831; NM_001164832; NM_001164836; NM_001164837	NM_022004
RefSeq (protein)	NP_001158303; NP_001158304; NP_001158308; NP_001158309; NP_071286	NP_071287
Location (UCSC)	Chr 11: 117.84 – 117.88 Mb	Chr 9: 45.28 – 45.31 Mb
PubMed search
- Wikidata
View/Edit Human	View/Edit Mouse

FXYD6 (pronounced fix-id six), or FXYD domain-containing ion transport regulator 6, is a gene which is located at the 11q23.3 (chromosome 11 locus 23.3). The FXYD6 protein contains 95 amino acids, and can be found in all human tissues except blood.

This gene belongs to the FXYD family of ion transport regulators

== Pathology ==
According to recent research, mutations in the FXYD6 gene, or in sequences close by this gene, can predispose to the schizophrenia which is known to be strongly heritable.
