= TMEM123 =

Protein-coding gene in the species Homo sapiens

Identifiers
- Aliases: TMEM123, KCT3, PORIMIN, PORMIN, transmembrane protein 123
- External IDs: OMIM: 606356; MGI: 1919179; HomoloGene: 14177; GeneCards: TMEM123; OMA:TMEM123 - orthologs

Gene location (Human)
Chr.	Chromosome 11 (human)
Band	11q22.2	Start	102,396,332 bp
Band	11q22.2	End	102,470,384 bp

Gene location (Mouse)
Chr.	Chromosome 9 (mouse)
Band	9|9 A1	Start	7,764,042 bp
Band	9|9 A1	End	7,794,334 bp
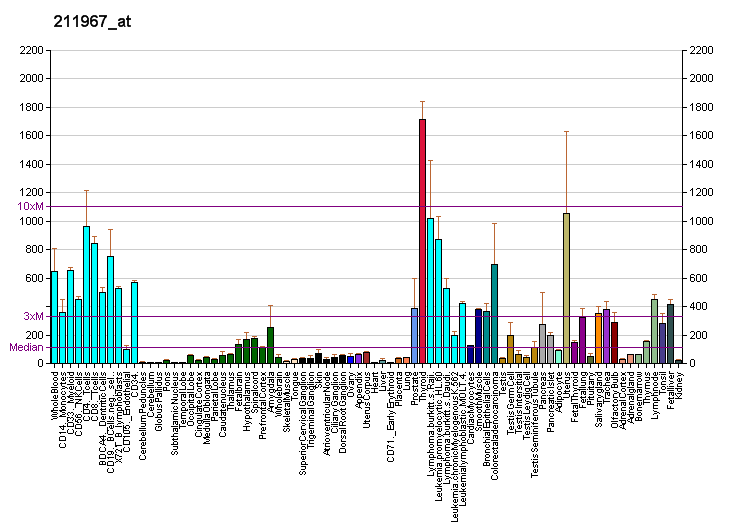
RNA expression pattern
Bgee	Human / Mouse (ortholog); Top expressed in: palpebral conjunctiva; epithelium of nasopharynx; olfactory zone of nasal mucosa; human penis; skin of thigh; germinal epithelium; epithelium of colon; tonsil; lymph node; ganglionic eminence / Top expressed in: mesenteric lymph nodes; transitional epithelium of urinary bladder; spleen; seminal vesicula; decidua; superior surface of tongue; conjunctival fornix; tunica media of zone of aorta; corneal stroma; blood; More reference expression data
BioGPS	More reference expression data
Gene ontology
Molecular function	protein binding; signaling receptor activity
Cellular component	integral component of membrane; membrane; external side of plasma membrane; cytoplasmic vesicle
Biological process	oncosis; signal transduction
Sources:Amigo / QuickGO
Orthologs
Species	Human	Mouse
Entrez	114908	71929
Ensembl	ENSG00000152558	ENSMUSG00000050912
UniProt	Q8N131	Q91Z22
RefSeq (mRNA)	NM_052932	NM_133739
RefSeq (protein)	NP_443164	NP_598500
Location (UCSC)	Chr 11: 102.4 – 102.47 Mb	Chr 9: 7.76 – 7.79 Mb
PubMed search
- Wikidata
View/Edit Human	View/Edit Mouse

Porimin is a protein that in humans is encoded by the TMEM123 gene.

This gene encodes a highly glycosylated transmembrane protein with a high content of threonine and serine residues in its extracellular domain, similar to a broadly defined category of proteins termed mucins.

Exposure of some cell types to anti-PORIMIN (pro-oncosis receptor inducing membrane injury) antibody, crosslinks this protein on the cell surface and induces a type of cell death termed oncosis.

Oncosis is distinct from apoptosis and is characterized by a loss of cell membrane integrity without DNA fragmentation. This gene product is proposed to function as a cell surface receptor that mediates cell death.
