= Charles W. Moorman III =

American historian

Charles Wickliffe Moorman III (May 24, 1925 – May 3, 1996) was an American writer, and professor at the University of Southern Mississippi from 1954 to 1990. He is notable for his writings on Middle English, medieval literature, the Arthurian legends and the mythic elements in the writings of the Inklings.

== Biography ==
Charles W. Moorman III, was born in Cincinnati, Ohio in 1925. He graduated from Kenyon College in 1949. He then earned his Master's (1951), and PhD (1953), both in English from Tulane University. He spent a year as an assistant professor at Auburn University before joining the University of Southern Mississippi as an associate professor of English in 1954. He taught in the English department for twelve years, was Dean of the graduate school for two years, then academic vice president for twelve years. He stepped down from that post in 1980, to return to teaching. He retired in 1990. Moorman died in Fayetteville Arkansas in 1996.

Throughout his career, and after, Moorman published regularly on a wide range of topics in medieval literature, Arthurian legends and Middle English. Two exceptions are his books; Arthurian Triptych: Mythic Materials in Charles Williams, C.S. Lewis, and T.S. Eliot, and The Precincts of Felicity: The Augustinian City of the Oxford Christians. These books deal with C.S. Lewis, Charles Williams and other Inklings, and are on lists for Inkling studies.

In all of his books Moorman used an informal style, making his books as accessible as he could to all. He considered himself “more an essayist than a scholar.”

== Honors ==
The professorship, The Charles W. Moorman Distinguished Alumni Professor in the Humanities, awarded by the College of Arts and Letters, at the University of Southern Mississippi, is named after him.

== Bibliography ==
- 1960. Arthurian Triptych: Mythic Materials in Charles Williams, C.S. Lewis, and T.S. Eliot. ISBN 0-8462-1716-3
- 1965. The Book of Kyng Arthur: The Unity of Malory's Morte D'arthur
- 1966. The Precincts of Felicity: The Augustinian City of the Oxford Christians.
- 1967. A Knyght There Was: The Evolution of the Knight in Literature. ISBN 0-8131-1133-1
- 1968. The Pearl-Poet, Volume 64 Twayne's English authors series. ISBN 0-8057-1432-4
- 1971. Kings & Captains: Variations on a Heroic Theme. ISBN 0-8131-1248-6
- 1975. Editing the Middle English Manuscript. ISBN 0-87805-063-9
- 1977. The Works of the Gawain-Poet. ISBN 0-87805-028-0
- 1978. An Arthurian Dictionary(with Ruth Minary). ISBN 0-89733-348-9
- 1993. The Statistical Determination of Affiliation in the Landmark Manuscripts of the Canterbury Tales. ISBN 0-7734-9276-3
- 1993. The Celtic literature of defeat: an extraordinary assortment of irregularities. ISBN 0-7734-9332-8
