= Mucosal melanoma =

Mucosal Melanoma
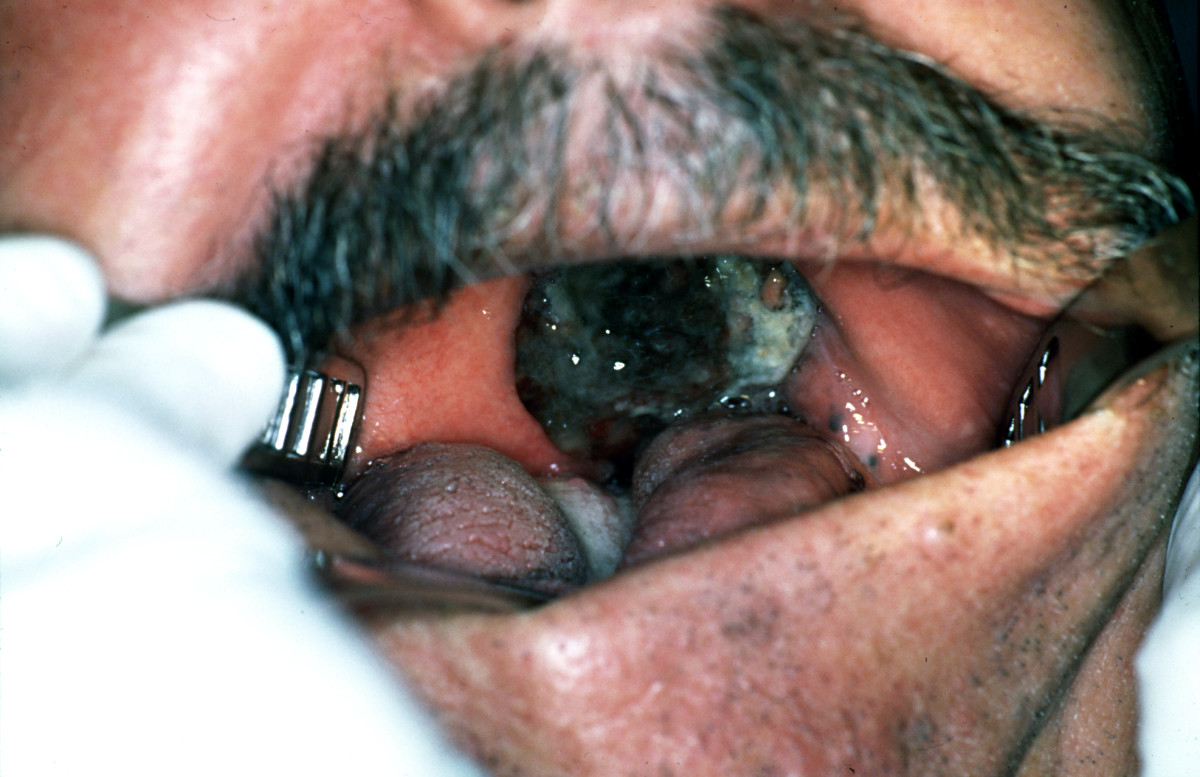
- Photograph at initial examination showing an oversized pigmented soft mass (melanoma) arising from the palate.
- Pronunciation: \ myü-ˈkō-zəl, \ ˌme-lə-ˈnō-mə
- Specialty: Oncology, pathology, dermatology, gynecology, gastroenterology
- Symptoms: malaise, fatigue, bleeding, diarrhea, constipation, nose bleeds, skin discoloration, itching, discharge, ulcers, anosmia, hyposmia, skin irritation, canker sores, bloody stools, bloody urine, gum disease, rosacea
- Complications: distant and/or microscopic metastasis
- Types: mucosal melanoma of the head and neck, vulvar melanoma, vaginal melanoma, anorectal melanoma
- Causes: smoking, carcinogens, genetics, chemicals, CID, HIV
- Diagnostic method: biopsy, colonoscopy
- Treatment: radiation, chemotherapy, surgery

Mucosal melanoma is a rare condition characterized by a melanoma of the mucous membranes. This subtype is associated a worse prognosis than those arising from the skin. Mucosal melanomas occur in the head and neck (55%), anorectal (24%) and vulvovaginal region (18%), and in the urinary tract (3%). Based on the histopathologic and clinical features, melanomas of the vulva and vagina are often considered a separate disease entity. The prognosis of vulvovaginal melanomas is poor, especially for vaginal melanomas and has not improved over the last decades. While chemotherapy has not shown capacity to improve survival in clinical and observational studies, immune checkpoint inhibitors (e.g., pembrolizumab) have been tested in mucosal melanomas and have shown promising response rates.

== See also ==
- Melanoma
