= TGOLN2 =

Protein-coding gene in the species Homo sapiens

Identifiers
- Aliases: TGOLN2, TGN38, TGN46, TGN48, TGN51, TTGN2, trans-golgi network protein 2, hTGN46, hTGN48, hTGN51
- External IDs: OMIM: 603062; HomoloGene: 136490; GeneCards: TGOLN2; OMA:TGOLN2 - orthologs

Gene location (Human)
| Chr. | Chromosome 2 (human) |
| Band | 2p11.2 | Start | 85,318,027 bp |
| Band | 2p11.2 | End | 85,328,251 bp |
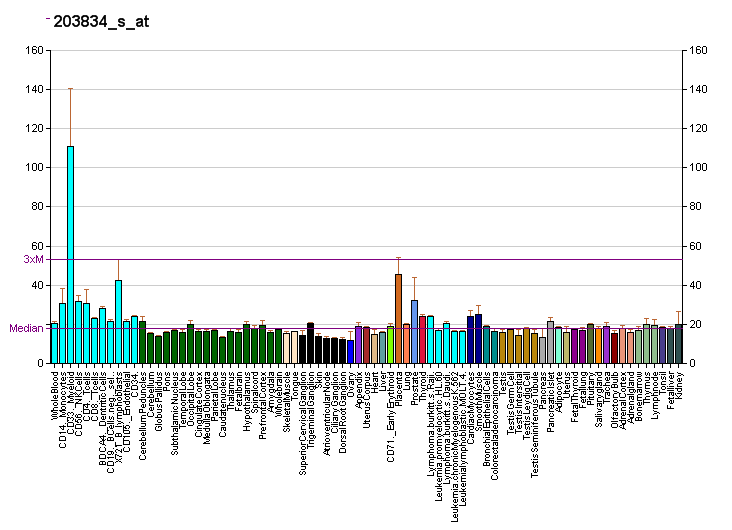

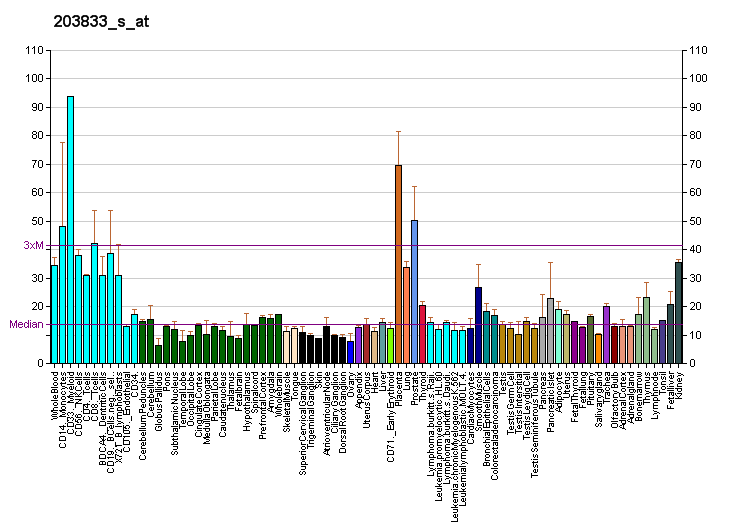

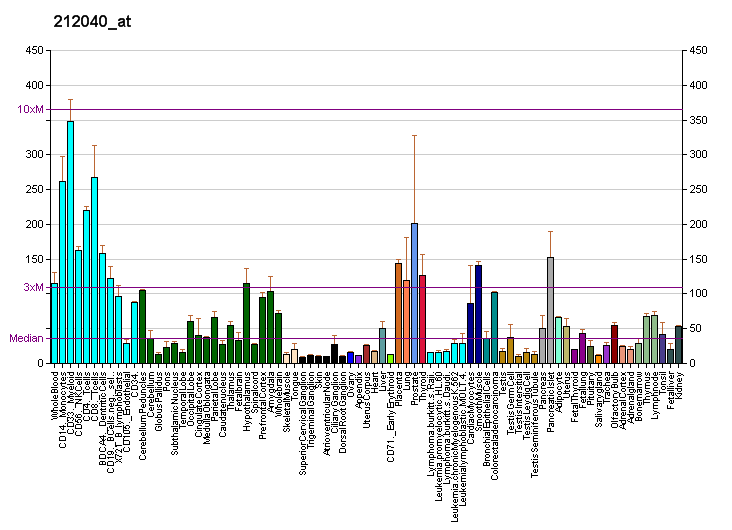
RNA expression pattern
| Bgee | Human / Mouse (ortholog); Top expressed in: renal medulla; parotid gland; caput epididymis; lateral nuclear group of thalamus; lactiferous duct; mucosa of sigmoid colon; lower lobe of lung; corpus epididymis; visceral pleura; Epithelium of choroid plexus / n/a; More reference expression data |
| BioGPS | More reference expression data |
Gene ontology
| Molecular function | protein binding |
| Cellular component | integral component of membrane; trans-Golgi network; Golgi apparatus; trans-Golgi network transport vesicle; transport vesicle; membrane; nucleoplasm; cytosol; plasma membrane; clathrin-coated vesicle membrane; endoplasmic reticulum lumen; endosome |
| Biological process | Golgi to endosome transport; membrane organization; post-translational protein modification |
Sources:Amigo / QuickGO
Orthologs
| Species | Human | Mouse |
| Entrez | 10618 | n/a |
| Ensembl | ENSG00000152291 | n/a |
| UniProt | O43493 | n/a |
| RefSeq (mRNA) | NM_006464; NM_001206840; NM_001206841; NM_001206844; NM_001368095 NM_001368096 | n/a |
| RefSeq (protein) | NP_001193769; NP_001193770; NP_001193773; NP_006455; NP_001355024 NP_001355025 | n/a |
| Location (UCSC) | Chr 2: 85.32 – 85.33 Mb | n/a |
| PubMed search | | n/a |
- Wikidata
| View/Edit Human |

Trans-Golgi network integral membrane protein 2 is a protein that in humans is encoded by the TGOLN2 gene.
