= FXYD domain-containing ion transport regulator 4 =

Mammalian protein found in Homo sapiens

FXYD4

Identifiers
- Aliases: FXYD4, CHIF, FXYD domain containing ion transport regulator 4
- External IDs: OMIM: 616926; MGI: 1889005; GeneCards: FXYD4

Gene location (Human)
Chr.	Chromosome 10 (human)
Band	10q11.21	Start	43,371,636 bp
Band	10q11.21	End	43,376,335 bp

Gene location (Mouse)
Chr.	Chromosome 6 (mouse)
Band	6|6 F1	Start	117,910,520 bp
Band	6|6 F1	End	117,914,653 bp
RNA expression pattern
Bgee	Human / Mouse (ortholog); Top expressed in: renal medulla; human kidney; testicle; muscle of thigh; C1 segment; body of stomach; upper lobe of left lung; left testis; right testis; putamen / Top expressed in: right kidney; left colon; uterus; blastocyst; medullary collecting duct; cervix; human kidney; molar; morula; embryo; More reference expression data
BioGPS	n/a
Gene ontology
Molecular function	ATPase binding; sodium channel regulator activity; ion channel activity; potassium channel activity; ion channel regulator activity
Cellular component	integral component of membrane; plasma membrane; integral component of plasma membrane; membrane; sodium:potassium-exchanging ATPase complex
Biological process	ion transport; regulation of sodium ion transmembrane transporter activity; potassium ion transmembrane transport; ion transmembrane transport; regulation of ion transport; regulation of cardiac conduction
Sources:Amigo / QuickGO
Orthologs
Databases	NCBI: entry; OMA: entry
Species	Human	Mouse
Entrez	53828	108017
Ensembl	ENSG00000150201	ENSMUSG00000004988
UniProt	P59646	Q9D2W0
RefSeq (mRNA)	NM_173160; NM_001184963	NM_001173372; NM_033648
RefSeq (protein)	NP_001171892; NP_775183	NP_001166843; NP_387468
Location (UCSC)	Chr 10: 43.37 – 43.38 Mb	Chr 6: 117.91 – 117.91 Mb
PubMed search
- Wikidata
View/Edit Human	View/Edit Mouse

FXYD domain containing ion transport regulator 4

Identifiers
- Symbol: FXYD4
- NCBI gene: 53828
- HGNC: 4028
- RefSeq: NM_173160
- UniProt: Q6UWZ1

Other data
- Locus: Chr. 10 q11.21
Search for
- Structures: Swiss-model
- Domains: InterPro

FXYD domain-containing ion transport regulator 4 is a regulatory protein for aldosterone receptors which in humans is encoded by the FXYD4 gene.

== See also ==
- Chromosome 10 (human)
- FXYD family
