= FXYD3 =

Protein-coding gene in the species Homo sapiens

Identifiers
- Aliases: FXYD3, MAT8, PLML, FXYD domain containing ion transport regulator 3
- External IDs: OMIM: 604996; MGI: 107497; GeneCards: FXYD3

Gene location (Human)
| Chr. | Chromosome 19 (human) |
| Band | 19q13.12 | Start | 35,115,823 bp |
| Band | 19q13.12 | End | 35,124,324 bp |

Gene location (Mouse)
| Chr. | Chromosome 7 (mouse) |
| Band | 7|7 B1 | Start | 30,767,597 bp |
| Band | 7|7 B1 | End | 30,776,129 bp |
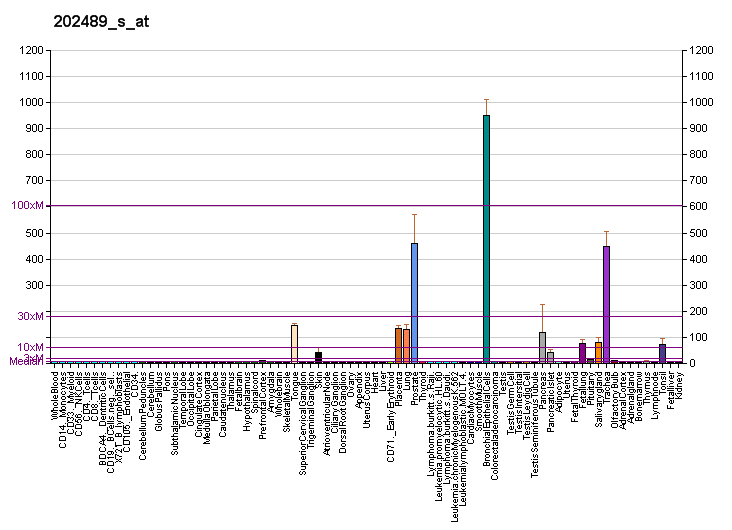

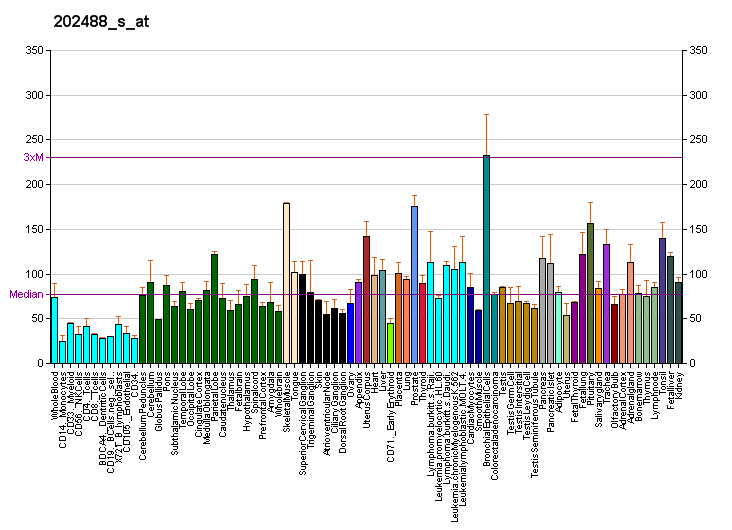
RNA expression pattern
| Bgee | Human / Mouse (ortholog); Top expressed in: mucosa of transverse colon; rectum; olfactory zone of nasal mucosa; skin of abdomen; mucosa of esophagus; skin of leg; salivary gland; minor salivary glands; prostate; tonsil / Top expressed in: epithelium of stomach; transitional epithelium of urinary bladder; mucous cell of stomach; parotid gland; pyloric antrum; corneal stroma; skin of external ear; lacrimal gland; molar; lip; More reference expression data |
| BioGPS | More reference expression data |
Gene ontology
| Molecular function | sodium channel regulator activity; ion channel activity; chloride channel activity; ion channel regulator activity |
| Cellular component | integral component of membrane; integral component of plasma membrane; extracellular exosome; membrane; plasma membrane |
| Biological process | ion transmembrane transport; regulation of cardiac conduction; ion transport; regulation of sodium ion transmembrane transporter activity; chloride transmembrane transport; transport; potassium ion transport; sodium ion transport; chloride transport; regulation of ion transport |
Sources:Amigo / QuickGO
Orthologs
| Databases | NCBI: entry; OMA: entry |
| Species | Human | Mouse |
| Entrez | 5349 | 17178 |
| Ensembl | ENSG00000089356 | ENSMUSG00000057092 |
| UniProt | Q14802 | Q61835 |
| RefSeq (mRNA) | NM_001136007; NM_001136008; NM_001136009; NM_001136010; NM_001136011 NM_001136012; NM_005971; NM_021910; NM_001387349; NM_001387350; NM_001387352; NM_001387353; NM_001387354; NM_001387355 | NM_008557 |
| RefSeq (protein) | NP_001129479; NP_001129480; NP_001129481; NP_001129482; NP_001129483 NP_001129484; NP_005962; NP_068710 | NP_032583 |
| Location (UCSC) | Chr 19: 35.12 – 35.12 Mb | Chr 7: 30.77 – 30.78 Mb |
| PubMed search |
- Wikidata
| View/Edit Human | View/Edit Mouse |

FXYD domain-containing ion transport regulator 3 is a protein that in humans is encoded by the FXYD3 gene.

== Function ==
This gene encodes a member of a family of small membrane proteins that share a 35-amino acid signature sequence domain, beginning with the sequence PFXYD and containing 7 invariant and 6 highly conserved amino acids. The approved human gene nomenclature for the family is FXYD-domain containing ion transport regulator. Mouse FXYD5 has been termed RIC (Related to Ion Channel). FXYD2, also known as the gamma subunit of the Na,K-ATPase, regulates the properties of that enzyme. FXYD1 (phospholemman), FXYD2 (gamma), FXYD3 (MAT-8), FXYD4 (CHIF), and FXYD5 (RIC) have been shown to induce channel activity in experimental expression systems. Transmembrane topology has been established for two family members (FXYD1 and FXYD2), with the N-terminus extracellular and the C-terminus on the cytoplasmic side of the membrane. The protein encoded by this gene may function as a chloride channel or as a chloride channel regulator. Two transcript variants encode two different isoforms of the protein; in addition, transcripts utilizing alternative polyA signals have been described in the literature.
