= FXYD2 =

Protein-coding gene in the species Homo sapiens

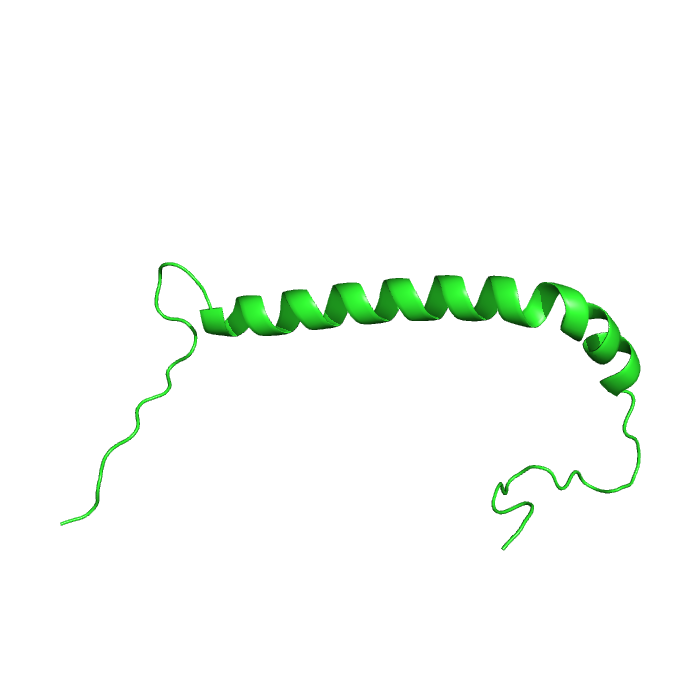

Identifiers
- Aliases: FXYD2, ATP1G1, HOMG2, FXYD domain containing ion transport regulator 2
- External IDs: OMIM: 601814; MGI: 1195260; GeneCards: FXYD2
Available structures
PDB	Ortholog search: PDBe RCSB
PDB	List of PDB id codes 2MKV

Gene location (Human)
Chr.	Chromosome 11 (human)
Band	11q23.3	Start	117,800,844 bp
Band	11q23.3	End	117,828,698 bp

Gene location (Mouse)
Chr.	Chromosome 9 (mouse)
Band	9|9 A5.2	Start	45,310,967 bp
Band	9|9 A5.2	End	45,321,576 bp
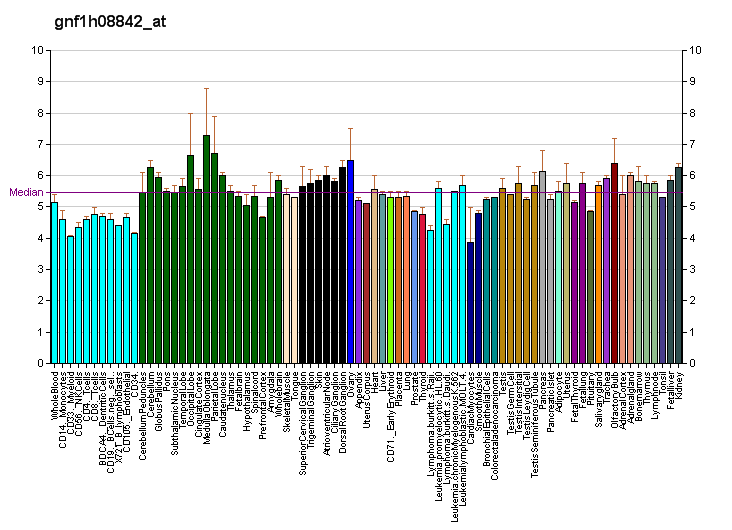

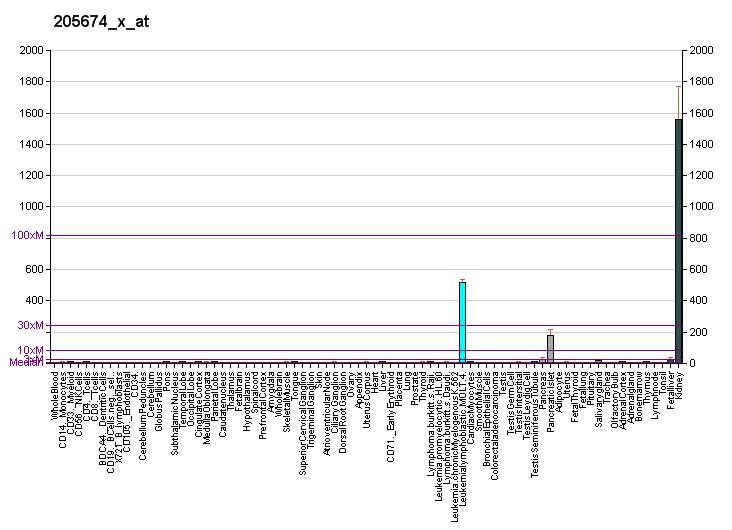
RNA expression pattern
Bgee	Human / Mouse (ortholog); Top expressed in: body of pancreas; gallbladder; islet of Langerhans; minor salivary glands; right lobe of liver; human kidney; olfactory zone of nasal mucosa; right ovary; epithelium of colon; testicle / Top expressed in: right kidney; human kidney; proximal tubule; submandibular gland; yolk sac; parotid gland; convoluted tubule; thymus; lumbar spinal ganglion; distal tubule; More reference expression data
BioGPS	More reference expression data
Gene ontology
Molecular function	transporter activity; ion channel activity; P-type sodium:potassium-exchanging transporter activity; sodium channel regulator activity; ion channel regulator activity
Cellular component	integral component of membrane; membrane; plasma membrane; extracellular exosome; integral component of plasma membrane; sodium:potassium-exchanging ATPase complex; basolateral plasma membrane; intracellular membrane-bounded organelle
Biological process	regulation of cardiac conduction; sodium ion transport; sodium ion export across plasma membrane; ion transport; potassium ion transport; ion transmembrane transport; potassium ion import across plasma membrane; establishment or maintenance of transmembrane electrochemical gradient; regulation of cell growth; regulation of cell population proliferation; regulation of sodium ion transmembrane transporter activity; transport; regulation of ion transport
Sources:Amigo / QuickGO
Orthologs
Databases	NCBI: entry; OMA: entry
Species	Human	Mouse
Entrez	486	11936
Ensembl	ENSG00000137731	ENSMUSG00000059412
UniProt	P54710	Q04646
RefSeq (mRNA)	NM_021603; NM_001127489; NM_001680	NM_007503; NM_052823
RefSeq (protein)	NP_001671; NP_067614	NP_031529; NP_439888; NP_001391593
Location (UCSC)	Chr 11: 117.8 – 117.83 Mb	Chr 9: 45.31 – 45.32 Mb
PubMed search
- Wikidata
View/Edit Human	View/Edit Mouse

Sodium/potassium-transporting ATPase gamma chain is a protein that in humans is encoded by the FXYD2 gene.

This gene encodes a member of a family of small membrane proteins that share a 35-amino acid signature sequence domain, beginning with the sequence PFXYD and containing 7 invariant and 6 highly conserved amino acids. The approved human gene nomenclature for the family is FXYD-domain containing ion transport regulator. Mouse FXYD5 has been termed RIC (Related to Ion Channel). FXYD2, also known as the gamma subunit of the Na,K-ATPase, regulates the properties of that enzyme. FXYD1 (phospholemman), FXYD2 (gamma), FXYD3 (MAT-8), FXYD4 (CHIF), and FXYD5 (RIC) have been shown to induce channel activity in experimental expression systems. Transmembrane topology has been established for two family members (FXYD1 and FXYD2), with the N-terminus extracellular and the C-terminus on the cytoplasmic side of the membrane. The Type III integral membrane protein encoded by this gene is the gamma subunit of the Na,K-ATPase present on the plasma membrane. Although the Na,K-ATPase does not depend on the gamma subunit to be functional, it is thought that the gamma subunit modulates the enzyme's activity by inducing ion channel activity. Mutations in this gene have been associated with renal hypomagnesaemia.
