= FXYD1 =

Protein-coding gene in the species Homo sapiens

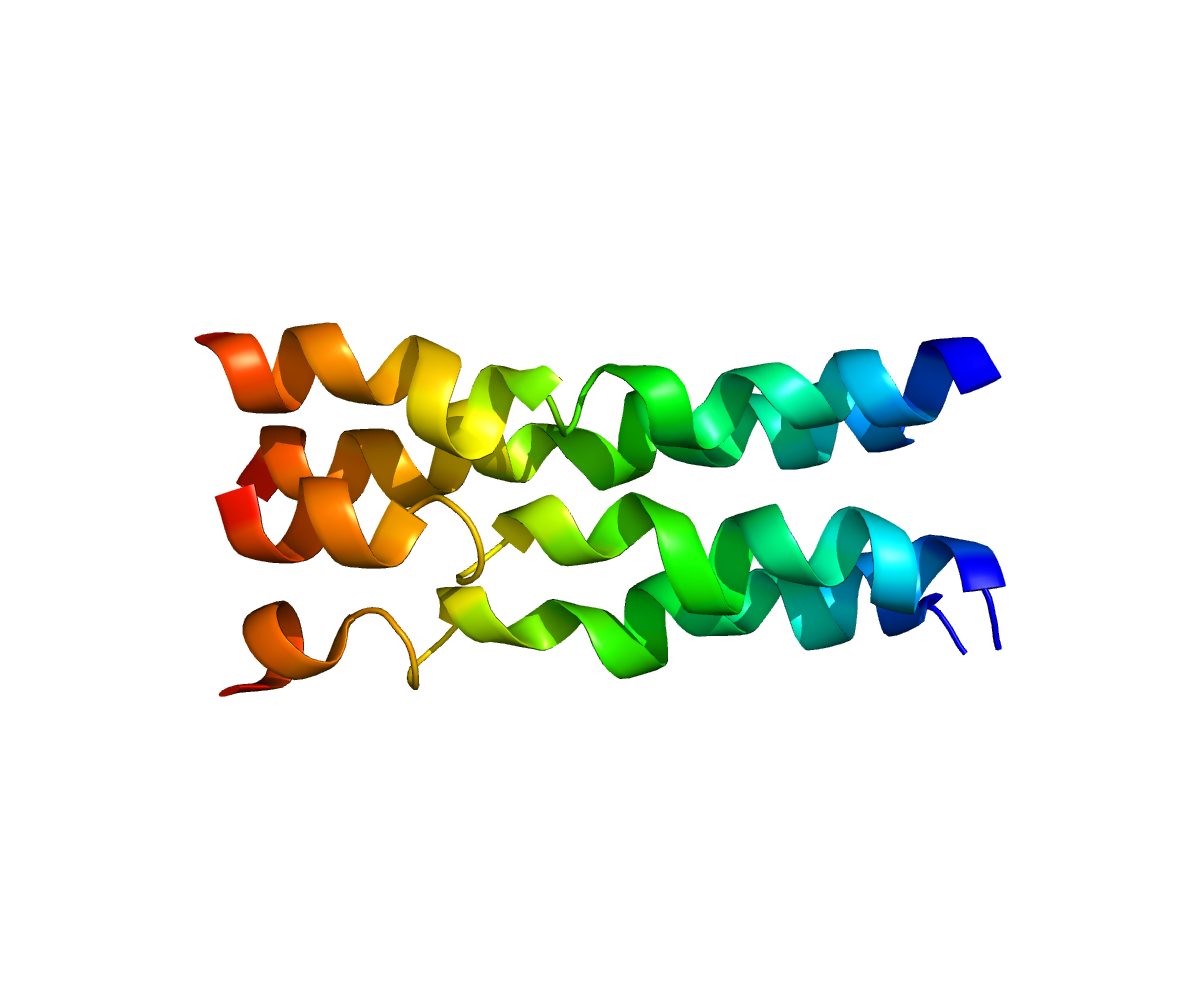

Identifiers
- Aliases: FXYD1, PLM, FXYD domain containing ion transport regulator 1
- External IDs: OMIM: 602359; MGI: 1889273; GeneCards: FXYD1
Available structures
PDB	Ortholog search: PDBe RCSB
PDB	List of PDB id codes 2JO1

Gene location (Human)
Chr.	Chromosome 19 (human)
Band	19q13.12	Start	35,138,824 bp
Band	19q13.12	End	35,143,109 bp

Gene location (Mouse)
Chr.	Chromosome 7 (mouse)
Band	7|7 B1	Start	30,751,103 bp
Band	7|7 B1	End	30,756,624 bp
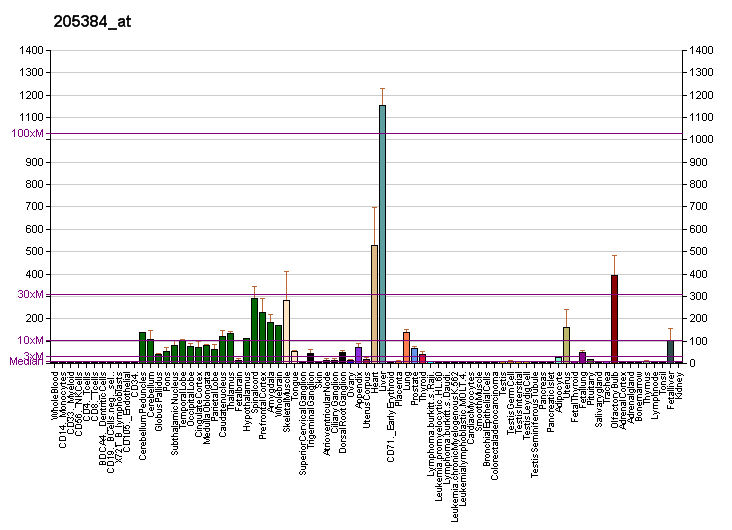
RNA expression pattern
Bgee	Human / Mouse (ortholog); Top expressed in: muscle of thigh; apex of heart; tibial nerve; gastrocnemius muscle; skeletal muscle tissue; right coronary artery; right auricle of heart; left ventricle; putamen; popliteal artery / Top expressed in: muscle of thigh; choroid plexus of fourth ventricle; ankle; triceps brachii muscle; temporal muscle; right ventricle; digastric muscle; interventricular septum; sternocleidomastoid muscle; soleus muscle; More reference expression data
BioGPS	More reference expression data
Gene ontology
Molecular function	sodium channel regulator activity; transmembrane transporter binding; ion channel activity; chloride channel activity; ion channel regulator activity
Cellular component	integral component of membrane; membrane; integral component of plasma membrane; sodium:potassium-exchanging ATPase complex; sarcolemma; T-tubule; intercalated disc; plasma membrane; caveola; apical plasma membrane
Biological process	muscle contraction; regulation of heart contraction; positive regulation of sodium ion export across plasma membrane; ion transport; regulation of sodium ion transmembrane transporter activity; regulation of cardiac muscle cell membrane potential; chloride transmembrane transport; negative regulation of protein glutathionylation; potassium ion transport; sodium ion transport; chloride transport; ion transmembrane transport; regulation of ion transport; regulation of cardiac conduction
Sources:Amigo / QuickGO
Orthologs
Databases	NCBI: entry; OMA: entry
Species	Human	Mouse
Entrez	5348	56188
Ensembl	ENSG00000266964	ENSMUSG00000036570
UniProt	O00168	Q9Z239
RefSeq (mRNA)	NM_021902; NM_001278717; NM_001278718; NM_005031	NM_019503; NM_052991; NM_052992; NM_194321
RefSeq (protein)	NP_001265646; NP_001265647; NP_005022; NP_068702	NP_062376; NP_443717; NP_443718; NP_919302
Location (UCSC)	Chr 19: 35.14 – 35.14 Mb	Chr 7: 30.75 – 30.76 Mb
PubMed search
- Wikidata
View/Edit Human	View/Edit Mouse

Phospholemman (PLM) is a protein that in humans is encoded by the FXYD1 gene.

This gene encodes a member of a family of small membrane proteins that share a 35-amino acid signature sequence domain, beginning with the sequence PFXYD and containing 7 invariant and 6 highly conserved amino acids. The approved human gene nomenclature for the family is FXYD-domain containing ion transport regulator. Mouse FXYD5 has been termed RIC (Related to Ion Channel). FXYD2, also known as the gamma subunit of the Na,K-ATPase, regulates the properties of that enzyme. FXYD1 (phospholemman), FXYD2 (gamma), FXYD3 (MAT-8), FXYD4 (CHIF), and FXYD5 (RIC) have been shown to induce channel activity in experimental expression systems. Transmembrane topology has been established for two family members (FXYD1 and FXYD2), with the N-terminus extracellular and the C-terminus on the cytoplasmic side of the membrane. The protein encoded by this gene is a plasma membrane substrate for several kinases, including protein kinase A, protein kinase C, NIMA kinase, and myotonic dystrophy kinase. It is thought to form an ion channel or regulate ion channel activity. Transcript variants with different 5' UTR sequences have been described in the literature.
