= Myocilin =

Protein found in humans

MYOC

Identifiers
- Aliases: MYOC, GLC1A, GPOA, JOAG, JOAG1, TIGR, myocilin
- External IDs: OMIM: 601652; MGI: 1202864; GeneCards: MYOC
Available structures
PDB	Ortholog search: PDBe RCSB
PDB	List of PDB id codes 4WXQ, 4WXS, 4WXU

Gene location (Human)
Chr.	Chromosome 1 (human)
Band	1q24.3	Start	171,635,417 bp
Band	1q24.3	End	171,652,688 bp

Gene location (Mouse)
Chr.	Chromosome 1 (mouse)
Band	1 H2.1|1 70.29 cM	Start	162,466,724 bp
Band	1 H2.1|1 70.29 cM	End	162,477,262 bp
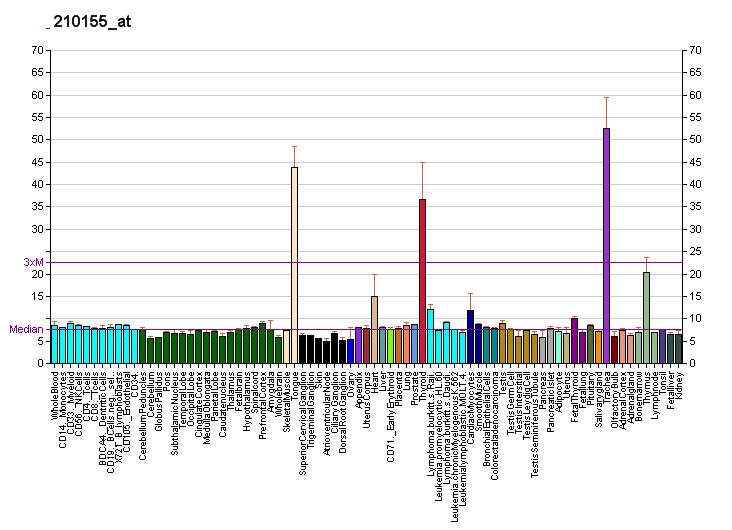
RNA expression pattern
Bgee	Human / Mouse (ortholog); Top expressed in: Achilles tendon; gastric mucosa; synovial joint; tibial nerve; popliteal artery; tibial arteries; glutes; right coronary artery; trachea; tendon of biceps brachii / Top expressed in: skin of external ear; ankle; lip; extensor digitorum longus muscle; intercostal muscle; plantaris muscle; Ependyma of ventricular system of brain; muscle of thigh; gastrocnemius muscle; medial head of gastrocnemius muscle; More reference expression data
BioGPS	More reference expression data
Gene ontology
Molecular function	frizzled binding; receptor tyrosine kinase binding; myosin light chain binding; protein binding; fibronectin binding; metal ion binding
Cellular component	mitochondrial outer membrane; cytoplasmic vesicle; rough endoplasmic reticulum; node of Ranvier; mitochondrial intermembrane space; cell projection; extracellular exosome; membrane; endoplasmic reticulum; extracellular matrix; Golgi apparatus; extracellular region; mitochondrion; cilium; mitochondrial inner membrane; extracellular space; collagen-containing extracellular matrix
Biological process	non-canonical Wnt signaling pathway via JNK cascade; regulation of cell-matrix adhesion; positive regulation of substrate adhesion-dependent cell spreading; myelination in peripheral nervous system; negative regulation of stress fiber assembly; positive regulation of focal adhesion assembly; positive regulation of phosphatidylinositol 3-kinase signaling; positive regulation of mitochondrial depolarization; ERBB2-ERBB3 signaling pathway; positive regulation of stress fiber assembly; clustering of voltage-gated sodium channels; bone development; positive regulation of cell migration; regulation of stress fiber assembly; negative regulation of Rho protein signal transduction; osteoblast differentiation; positive regulation of protein kinase B signaling; skeletal muscle hypertrophy; neuron projection development; regulation of MAPK cascade; negative regulation of cell-matrix adhesion
Sources:Amigo / QuickGO
Orthologs
Databases	NCBI: entry; OMA: entry
Species	Human	Mouse
Entrez	4653	17926
Ensembl	ENSG00000034971	ENSMUSG00000026697
UniProt	Q99972	O70624
RefSeq (mRNA)	NM_000261	NM_010865
RefSeq (protein)	NP_000252	NP_034995
Location (UCSC)	Chr 1: 171.64 – 171.65 Mb	Chr 1: 162.47 – 162.48 Mb
PubMed search
- Wikidata
View/Edit Human	View/Edit Mouse

Myocilin, trabecular meshwork inducible glucocorticoid response (TIGR), also known as MYOC, is a protein which in humans is encoded by the MYOC gene. Mutations in MYOC are a major cause of glaucoma.

== Gene location ==
The cytogenetic location of human MYOC gene is on the long (q) arm of chromosome 1, specifically at position 24.3 (1q24.3). The gene's molecular location starts at 171,635,417 bp and ends at 171,652,63 bp on chromosome 1 (Annotation: GRCh38.p12) (assembly).

== Protein characteristics ==
Myocilin is a protein with a weight of 55 kDa (504 amino acid) and an overall acidic property, the product of the first gene that has been linked to Primary Open Angle Glaucoma (POAG).

=== Protein structure ===
The protein is made up of the two folding domains, the leucine zipper-like domain at the N-terminal and an olfactomedin-like domain at the C-terminal. The domain at the N-terminal is known to have 77.6% homology to the myosin heavy chain of Dictyostelium discoideum and 25% homology with the cardiac β-myosin heavy chain. The gene encodes three different exons, each consisting of different structural and functional domains.

The N-terminal is encoded by exon 1 and contains the leucine zipper structural motif, which consists of 50 amino acid residues (117-169 amino acids). The motif is found on an α-helix, which enhances the binding of the protein. The name of the domain arises due to the occurrence of leucine as well as, arginine repeats periodically on the α-helix. The leucine zipper domain also contains the myocilin-myocilin interactions between amino acid residues 117–166. Exon 2 encodes the central region of the protein at amino acid residues 203–245; however, no structural or functional domains are found in this region. Exon 3 encodes the C-terminal of myocilin and has been found to contain the olfactomedin-like domain. The olfactomedin is an extracellular matrix protein with no defined role but is abundantly found in the olfactory neuroepithelium. In the myocilin protein, the domain consists of a single disulfide bond which connects two cysteine residues (245 and 433 amino acids).

=== Protein localisation ===
Myocilin is specifically located in the ciliary rootlet and basal body which connects to the cilium of photoreceptor cells in the rough endoplasmic reticulum. The intracellularly distributed protein is processed in the endoplasmic reticulum (ER) and in secreted into the aqueous humour. It is only imported into the trabecular meshwork of the mitochondria. In the extracellular space, it appears in the trabecular meshwork cells through an unconventional mechanism which is associated with exosome-like vesicles. Myocilin localises in the Golgi apparatus of corneal fibroblasts and Schlemm's canal endothelial cells.

== Protein processing ==
Several isoforms are produced due to post-translational modifications processes, including glycosylation and palmitoylation. The gene undergoes N-glycosylation at the Asn-Glu-Ser site (57–59 amino acids) and O-glycosylation throughout the protein at the Ser-Pro, Pro-Ser, Thr-Xaa-Xaa-Pro, Ser-Xaa-Xaa-Xaa-Pro sites.

Myocilin also undergoes a proteolytic cleavage in the endoplasmic reticulum at residue Arg-226. The cleavage process is calcium dependant and results in two fragments. One fragment contains the C-terminal olfactomedin-like domain (35 kDa), and the other contains the N-terminal leucine zipper-like domain (20 kDa).

== Function ==
MYOC encodes the protein myocilin. The precise function of myocilin is unknown, but it is normally secreted into the aqueous humor of the eye. MYOC mutations, which cause myocilin to accumulate in the cells of the trabecular meshwork are a common cause of glaucoma. Most MYOC mutations identified in glaucoma patients are heterozygous and are confined to the olfactomedin domain, which is encoded by exon 3.

Myocilin is believed to have a role in cytoskeletal function. MYOC is expressed in many ocular tissues, including the trabecular meshwork, and was revealed to be the trabecular meshwork glucocorticoid-inducible response protein (TIGR). The trabecular meshwork is a specialized eye tissue essential in regulating intraocular pressure, and mutations in MYOC have been identified as the cause of hereditary juvenile-onset open-angle glaucoma.

Scientific research has found the function of myocilin to be linked with other proteins, making it part of a protein complex. The isoform of the cytochrome P450 protein, 1B1 (CYP1B1) has shown interaction with myocilin. CYP1B1 is also found in several structures so the eye including, trabecular meshwork and the ciliary body.

== Mutations and associated diseases ==
Differing mutations in the MYOC gene have been reported to associate with glaucoma 1, open angle (GLC1A) and glaucoma 3, primary congenital (GLC3A).

=== Glaucoma 1, open angle (GLC1A) ===
Glaucoma 1 is a form of primary open-angle glaucoma (POAG), which is characterized based on a specific pattern of defects in the optic nerve, thus causing visual defects. The disease causes an angle in the anterior chamber of the eye to be left open, which in turn causes the intraocular pressure to be increased. Although an increase in the intraocular pressure is a major factor for glaucoma, the disease can occur independently of the intraocular pressure. Furthermore, the damage done to the optical nerve has been classified as irreversible because no symptoms of the disease are apparent (asymptomatic) until its last stages.

=== Glaucoma 3, primary congenital (GLC3A) ===
Glaucoma 3 arises due to mutations in the distinct genetic loci of MYOC. This mutation contributes to GLC3A through digenic inheritance with the CYP1B1 protein. The mutation gives rise to an autosomal recessive form of primary congenital glaucoma (PCG). The disease initiates at birth or in early childhood due to the increase in intraocular pressure, large ocular globes (buphthalmos) and corneal edema. The progression of the disease causes defects in the trabecular meshwork and anterior chamber angle of the eye preventing the drainage from the aqueous humor.

Overall frequency of disease-causing mutations at MYOC in different races
Race	Occurrence frequency (%)
African	4.44
Asian	3.30
Caucasian	3.86

== Clinical significance ==
MYOC contains a signal sequence for secretion and is secreted into the aqueous humor of the eye by the trabecular meshwork. Mutations in MYOC are found in 4% of adult-onset primary open-angle glaucoma and >10% of juvenile-onset primary open-angle glaucoma. Overexpression or underexpression of MYOC does not cause glaucoma. However, the MYOC gene also contains a signal sequence, which is normally not functional, that directs intracellular proteins to peroxisomes. Glaucoma-associated mutations activate that signal sequence and direct myocilin to peroxisomes, where they accumulate in the cell, instead of being secreted. Decreased secretion and increased accumulation appear to be the initial steps in myocilin-associated glaucoma.

A study employing an iterative pocket and ligand-similarity based approach to virtual ligand screening predicted small molecule binders for the olfactomedin domain of human myocilin. The predictions were subsequently assessed by differential scanning fluorimetry.

== Interactions ==
MYOC has been shown to interact with the following proteins:

- OLFM3
- FN1
- NRCAM
- GLDN
- NFASC
- MYL2
- SFRP1
- FRZB
- FZD7
- FZD10
- FZD1
- WIF1
- SNTA1
- ERBB2
- ERBB3
- SNCG
