= Paola Bovolenta =

Italian-Spanish developmental neurobiologist

Paola Bovolenta is an Italian-Spanish developmental neurobiologist. She is a Research Professor at the Spanish National Research Council (CSIC) and serves as Head of Unit 709 of the Center for Biomedical Network Research on Rare Diseases (CIBERER). She is also the Director of the Centro de Biología Molecular Severo Ochoa (CBM) in Madrid, Spain.

== Early life and education ==
Bovolenta studied biology at the University of Florence, graduating in 1981. She later moved to the United States, where she earned her Ph.D. in 1986 from the New York University School of Medicine. During her doctoral studies, she worked in the laboratory of Carol A. Mason on astroglial development and axon guidance in the cerebellum and visual system. She continued her research as a postdoctoral fellow at Columbia University’s Center for Neurobiology and Behavior.

== Career ==
In 1989, Bovolenta joined the Cajal Institute of CSIC in Madrid, initially as a research associate in the laboratory of Manuel Nieto-Sampedro. There, she investigated the role of proteoglycans in inhibiting axon regeneration in the central nervous system. In 1996, she began leading her own research group at the Instituto Cajal and later held senior leadership positions, including Chair of the Cellular, Molecular and Developmental Neurobiology Department.

She became a Research Professor in 2002 and has since held various leadership roles, including Chair of the Tissue and Organ Homeostasis Program at CBM (2012–2022) and Coordinator of the Biology and Biomedicine Area of the CSIC (2008–2012). She has also served as Head of the CIBERER Unit 709 and as Scientific Director of the CBM Center of Excellence.

From 2017 to 2022, she served on the Scientific Council of the European Research Council (ERC), chairing its Open Science Working Group Bovolenta has also participated the in committees for Society for Neuroscience (SfN), and served as Treasurer the Spanish Developmental Biology Society (SEBD) and President of the Spanish Society for Neuroscience (SENC). She is currently President Elected of the Federation of European Neuroscience Societies (FENS).

== Research work ==
Bovolenta's research is primarily focused on two major areas: the development of the visual system and the molecular mechanisms of neurodegeneration. Her developmental biology work has contributed to the understanding of gene regulatory networks and morphogenetic processes governing eye formation and associated congenital disorders such as microphthalmia and coloboma. She is also involved in studies related to congenital retinal dystrophies.

Her second line of research investigates the role of the secreted protein SFRP1 in neurodegeneration and neuroinflammation. Her work has demonstrated that SFRP1 contributes to Alzheimer’s disease pathology through effects on amyloid precursor protein (APP) processing and synaptic plasticity. Therapeutic approaches targeting SFRP1 are being explored, including antibody-based treatments, under international patent protection and with funding from the Cure Alzheimer's Fund.

== Awards and honors ==
- Elected Member, European Molecular Biology Organization (EMBO), 2012
- Elected Member, Academia Europaea, 2022
- Decoration of Order of the Star of Italy (2024)
