= Olfactomedin 3 =

Protein found in humans

OLFM3

Identifiers
- Aliases: OLFM3, NOE3, NOELIN3, OPTIMEDIN, olfactomedin 3
- External IDs: OMIM: 607567; MGI: 2387329; GeneCards: OLFM3

Gene location (Human)
Chr.	Chromosome 1 (human)
Band	1p21.1	Start	101,802,560 bp
Band	1p21.1	End	101,996,926 bp

Gene location (Mouse)
Chr.	Chromosome 3 (mouse)
Band	3|3 F3	Start	114,697,727 bp
Band	3|3 F3	End	114,919,371 bp
RNA expression pattern
Bgee	Human / Mouse (ortholog); Top expressed in: endothelial cell; Brodmann area 23; middle temporal gyrus; superior frontal gyrus; Brodmann area 46; prefrontal cortex; dorsolateral prefrontal cortex; Brodmann area 9; lateral nuclear group of thalamus; postcentral gyrus / Top expressed in: lobe of cerebellum; cerebellar vermis; habenula; olfactory tubercle; substantia nigra; medial geniculate nucleus; mammillary body; lateral geniculate nucleus; paraventricular nucleus of hypothalamus; superior colliculus; More reference expression data
BioGPS	n/a
Gene ontology
Molecular function	protein binding
Cellular component	extracellular region; cell junction; Golgi apparatus; AMPA glutamate receptor complex; synapse; extracellular space
Biological process	eye photoreceptor cell development
Sources:Amigo / QuickGO
Orthologs
Databases	NCBI: entry; OMA: entry
Species	Human	Mouse
Entrez	118427	229759
Ensembl	ENSG00000118733	ENSMUSG00000027965
UniProt	Q96PB7	P63056
RefSeq (mRNA)	NM_001288821; NM_001288823; NM_058170	NM_001286750; NM_153157; NM_153458
RefSeq (protein)	NP_001275750; NP_001275752; NP_477518	NP_001273679; NP_694797; NP_703188
Location (UCSC)	Chr 1: 101.8 – 102 Mb	Chr 3: 114.7 – 114.92 Mb
PubMed search
- Wikidata
View/Edit Human	View/Edit Mouse

Olfactomedin 3, also known as noelin 3 or optimedin, is a protein that in humans is encoded by the OLFM3 gene.

== Interactions ==
OLFM3 has been shown to interact with MYOC.
