= Frizzled-3 =

Protein-coding gene in the species Homo sapiens

FZD3

Identifiers
- Aliases: FZD3, Fz-3, frizzled class receptor 3
- External IDs: OMIM: 606143; MGI: 108476; GeneCards: FZD3

Gene location (Human)
Chr.	Chromosome 8 (human)
Band	8p21.1	Start	28,494,205 bp
Band	8p21.1	End	28,574,267 bp

Gene location (Mouse)
Chr.	Chromosome 14 (mouse)
Band	14 D1|14 34.09 cM	Start	65,429,898 bp
Band	14 D1|14 34.09 cM	End	65,499,912 bp
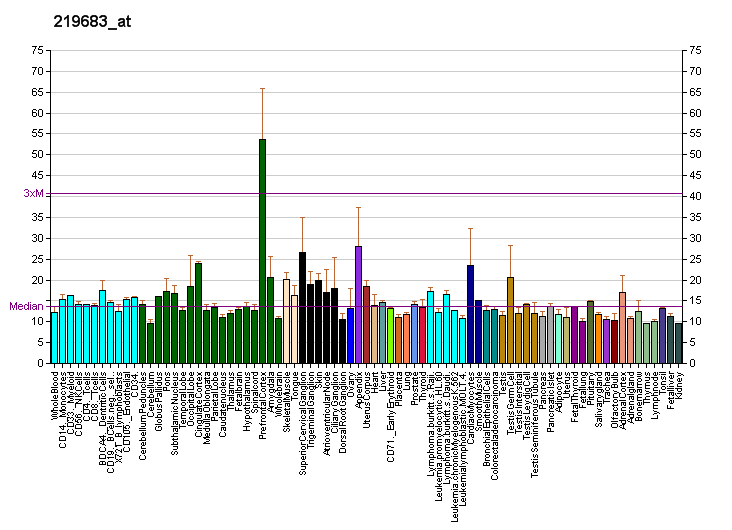
RNA expression pattern
Bgee	Human / Mouse (ortholog); Top expressed in: Brodmann area 23; secondary oocyte; corpus epididymis; middle temporal gyrus; endothelial cell; entorhinal cortex; parietal lobe; postcentral gyrus; cerebellar vermis; buccal mucosa cell / Top expressed in: medial ganglionic eminence; Rostral migratory stream; anterior amygdaloid area; olfactory tubercle; ventromedial nucleus; vestibular sensory epithelium; trigeminal ganglion; substantia nigra; lateral septal nucleus; paraventricular nucleus of hypothalamus; More reference expression data
BioGPS	More reference expression data
Gene ontology
Molecular function	PDZ domain binding; signal transducer activity; Wnt-protein binding; protein binding; transmembrane signaling receptor activity; G protein-coupled receptor activity; Wnt-activated receptor activity
Cellular component	cytoplasm; lateral plasma membrane; membrane; plasma membrane; apical part of cell; presynaptic active zone; cell surface; axon; filopodium tip; soma; dendrite; apical plasma membrane; integral component of membrane
Biological process	hair follicle development; dopaminergic neuron axon guidance; positive regulation of neuroblast proliferation; sympathetic ganglion development; G protein-coupled receptor signaling pathway; negative regulation of execution phase of apoptosis; negative regulation of mitotic cell cycle, embryonic; serotonergic neuron axon guidance; establishment of planar polarity; cell proliferation in midbrain; neuron migration; Wnt signaling pathway; commissural neuron axon guidance; nervous system development; multicellular organism development; neural tube closure; cell surface receptor signaling pathway; inner ear morphogenesis; neuron differentiation; post-anal tail morphogenesis; canonical Wnt signaling pathway; midbrain morphogenesis; midbrain development; signal transduction; response to electrical stimulus; Wnt signaling pathway, calcium modulating pathway; brain development; planar cell polarity pathway involved in axon guidance; Wnt signaling pathway, planar cell polarity pathway; non-canonical Wnt signaling pathway
Sources:Amigo / QuickGO
Orthologs
Databases	NCBI: entry; OMA: entry
Species	Human	Mouse
Entrez	7976	14365
Ensembl	ENSG00000104290	ENSMUSG00000007989
UniProt	Q9NPG1	Q61086
RefSeq (mRNA)	NM_017412; NM_145866	NM_021458
RefSeq (protein)	NP_059108; NP_665873	NP_067433
Location (UCSC)	Chr 8: 28.49 – 28.57 Mb	Chr 14: 65.43 – 65.5 Mb
PubMed search
- Wikidata
View/Edit Human	View/Edit Mouse

Frizzled-3 (Fz-3) is a protein that in humans is encoded by the FZD3 gene.

== Function ==
This gene is a member of the frizzled gene family. Members of this family encode seven-transmembrane domain proteins that are receptors for the Wingless type MMTV integration site family of signaling proteins. Most frizzled receptors are coupled to the beta-catenin canonical signaling pathway. It may play a role in mammalian hair follicle development.

The function of this gene is largely derived from mouse studies. Fzd3 in the mouse functions through planar cell polarity signaling instead of the canonical Wnt/beta-catenin pathway. Fzd3 controls axon growth and guidance in the mouse nervous system, and migration of neural crest cells.

== See also ==
- Frizzled
