= Frizzled-6 =

Protein-coding gene in the species Homo sapiens

FZD6

Identifiers
- Aliases: FZD6, FZ-6, FZ6, HFZ6, NDNC10, frizzled class receptor 6, NDNC1
- External IDs: OMIM: 603409; MGI: 108474; GeneCards: FZD6

Gene location (Human)
Chr.	Chromosome 8 (human)
Band	8q22.3	Start	103,298,433 bp
Band	8q22.3	End	103,332,866 bp

Gene location (Mouse)
Chr.	Chromosome 15 (mouse)
Band	15 B3.1|15 15.22 cM	Start	38,869,429 bp
Band	15 B3.1|15 15.22 cM	End	38,901,583 bp
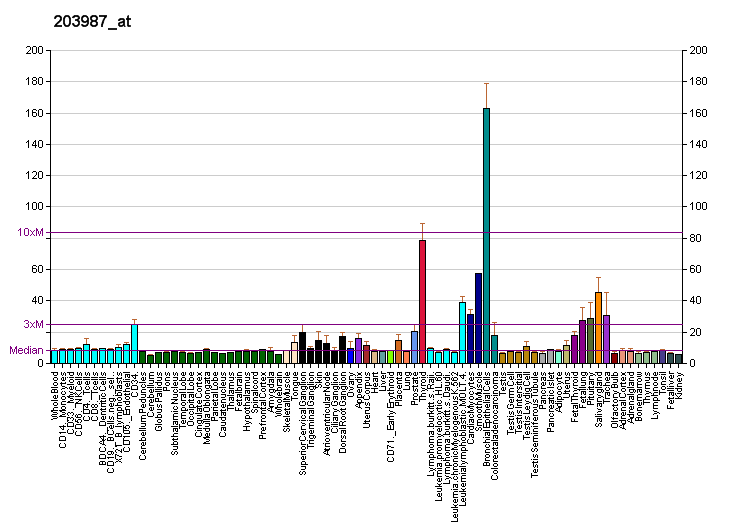
RNA expression pattern
Bgee	Human / Mouse (ortholog); Top expressed in: bronchial epithelial cell; caput epididymis; Epithelium of choroid plexus; skin of thigh; skin of hip; corpus epididymis; epithelium of nasopharynx; palpebral conjunctiva; secondary oocyte; hair follicle / Top expressed in: lip; uterus; genital tubercle; lens; esophagus; zone of skin; heart; spermatocyte; urethra; lower respiratory tract; More reference expression data
BioGPS	More reference expression data
Gene ontology
Molecular function	signal transducer activity; protein binding; Wnt-activated receptor activity; ubiquitin protein ligase binding; transmembrane signaling receptor activity; G protein-coupled receptor activity; Wnt-protein binding; amyloid-beta binding
Cellular component	membrane; apical part of cell; integral component of plasma membrane; cell surface; apicolateral plasma membrane; apical plasma membrane; cytoplasmic vesicle membrane; cytoplasmic vesicle; plasma membrane; integral component of membrane
Biological process	hair follicle development; G protein-coupled receptor signaling pathway; non-canonical Wnt signaling pathway; establishment of planar polarity; cell proliferation in midbrain; Wnt signaling pathway; negative regulation of DNA-binding transcription factor activity; platelet activation; multicellular organism development; Wnt signaling pathway, planar cell polarity pathway; embryonic nail plate morphogenesis; cell surface receptor signaling pathway; neural tube closure; inner ear morphogenesis; midbrain morphogenesis; negative regulation of canonical Wnt signaling pathway; signal transduction; midbrain development; Wnt signaling pathway, calcium modulating pathway; establishment of body hair planar orientation; canonical Wnt signaling pathway
Sources:Amigo / QuickGO
Orthologs
Databases	NCBI: entry; OMA: entry
Species	Human	Mouse
Entrez	8323	14368
Ensembl	ENSG00000164930	ENSMUSG00000022297
UniProt	O60353	Q61089
RefSeq (mRNA)	NM_001164615; NM_001164616; NM_003506; NM_001317796	NM_001162494; NM_008056
RefSeq (protein)	NP_001158087; NP_001158088; NP_001304725; NP_003497; NP_001158087.1 NP_003497.2	NP_001155966; NP_032082
Location (UCSC)	Chr 8: 103.3 – 103.33 Mb	Chr 15: 38.87 – 38.9 Mb
PubMed search
- Wikidata
View/Edit Human	View/Edit Mouse

Frizzled-6 (Fz-6) is a protein that in humans is encoded by the FZD6 gene.

Members of the 'frizzled' gene family encode 7-transmembrane domain proteins that are receptors for WNT signaling proteins. The FZD6 protein contains a signal peptide, a cysteine-rich domain in the N-terminal extracellular region, and 7 transmembrane domains. However, unlike many other FZD family members, FDZ6 does not contain a C-terminal PDZ domain-binding motif. Fz-6 is believed to be the receptor for the WNT4 ligand.

== Interactions ==
Fz-6 has been shown to interact with secreted frizzled-related protein 1.
