= Frizzled-8 =

Protein-coding gene in the species Homo sapiens

FZD8
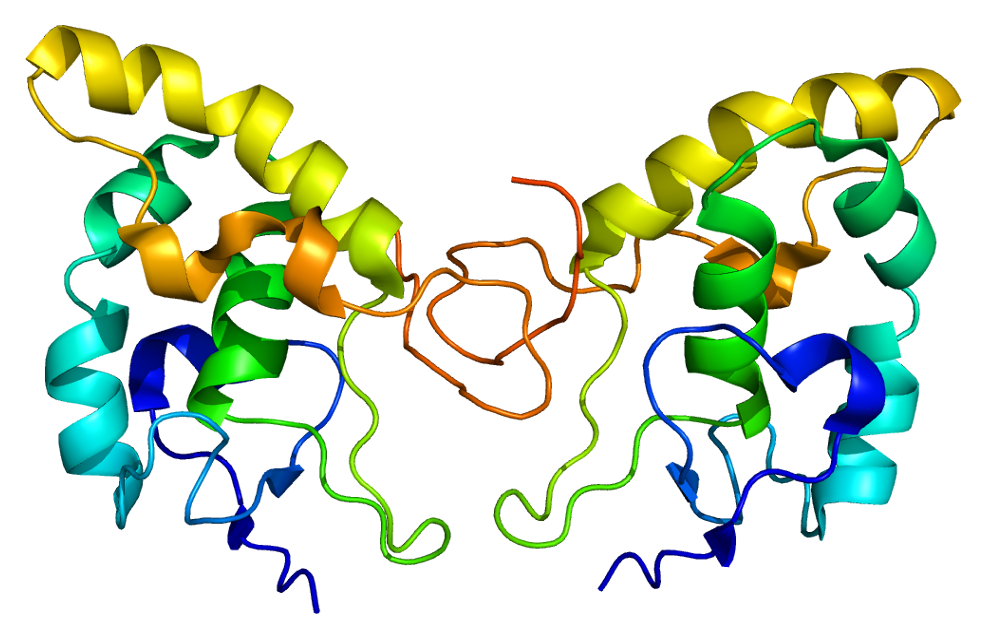

Identifiers
- Aliases: FZD8, FZ-8, hFZ8, frizzled class receptor 8
- External IDs: OMIM: 606146; MGI: 108460; GeneCards: FZD8
Available structures
PDB	Ortholog search: PDBe RCSB
PDB	List of PDB id codes 1IJY, 4F0A

Gene location (Human)
Chr.	Chromosome 10 (human)
Band	10p11.21	Start	35,638,247 bp
Band	10p11.21	End	35,642,296 bp

Gene location (Mouse)
Chr.	Chromosome 18 (mouse)
Band	18 A1|18 4.91 cM	Start	9,212,163 bp
Band	18 A1|18 4.91 cM	End	9,218,136 bp
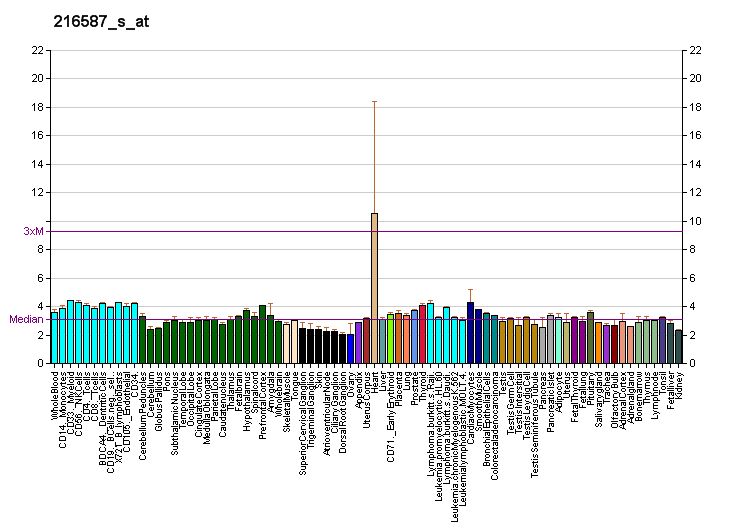
RNA expression pattern
Bgee	Human / Mouse (ortholog); Top expressed in: ventricular zone; cartilage tissue; ganglionic eminence; retinal pigment epithelium; tendon of biceps brachii; trabecular bone; lactiferous duct; pancreatic epithelial cell; pancreatic ductal cell; spinal ganglia / Top expressed in: ventricular zone; hypoblast; calvaria; retinal pigment epithelium; left lobe of liver; ankle; ciliary body; molar; primitive endoderm; trigeminal ganglion; More reference expression data
BioGPS	More reference expression data
Gene ontology
Molecular function	transmembrane signaling receptor activity; signaling receptor binding; ubiquitin protein ligase binding; protein binding; signal transducer activity; PDZ domain binding; G protein-coupled receptor activity; Wnt-protein binding; Wnt-activated receptor activity
Cellular component	integral component of membrane; membrane; plasma membrane; Golgi apparatus; Wnt-Frizzled-LRP5/6 complex
Biological process	positive regulation of protein phosphorylation; positive regulation of JUN kinase activity; cell surface receptor signaling pathway; G protein-coupled receptor signaling pathway; angiogenesis; positive regulation of transcription by RNA polymerase II; multicellular organism development; negative regulation of transcription by RNA polymerase II; neuron differentiation; signal transduction; Wnt signaling pathway; T cell differentiation in thymus; non-canonical Wnt signaling pathway; canonical Wnt signaling pathway
Sources:Amigo / QuickGO
Orthologs
Databases	NCBI: entry; OMA: entry
Species	Human	Mouse
Entrez	8325	14370
Ensembl	ENSG00000177283	ENSMUSG00000036904
UniProt	Q9H461	Q61091
RefSeq (mRNA)	NM_031866	NM_008058
RefSeq (protein)	NP_114072	NP_032084
Location (UCSC)	Chr 10: 35.64 – 35.64 Mb	Chr 18: 9.21 – 9.22 Mb
PubMed search
- Wikidata
View/Edit Human	View/Edit Mouse

Frizzled-8 (Fz-8) is a protein that in humans is encoded by the FZD8 gene.

== Function ==
This intronless gene is a member of the frizzled gene family. Members of this family encode seven-transmembrane domain proteins that are receptors for the Wingless type MMTV integration site family of signaling proteins. Most frizzled receptors are coupled to the beta-catenin canonical signaling pathway. This gene is highly expressed in two human cancer cell lines, indicating that it may play a role in several types of cancer. The crystal structure of the extracellular cysteine-rich domain of a similar mouse protein has been determined.
