= Frizzled-2 =

Protein found in humans

FZD2

Identifiers
- Aliases: FZD2, Fz2, fz-2, fzE2, hFz2, frizzled class receptor 2, OMOD2
- External IDs: OMIM: 600667; MGI: 1888513; GeneCards: FZD2

Gene location (Human)
Chr.	Chromosome 17 (human)
Band	17q21.31	Start	44,557,484 bp
Band	17q21.31	End	44,561,262 bp

Gene location (Mouse)
Chr.	Chromosome 11 (mouse)
Band	11|11 E1	Start	102,495,222 bp
Band	11|11 E1	End	102,498,884 bp
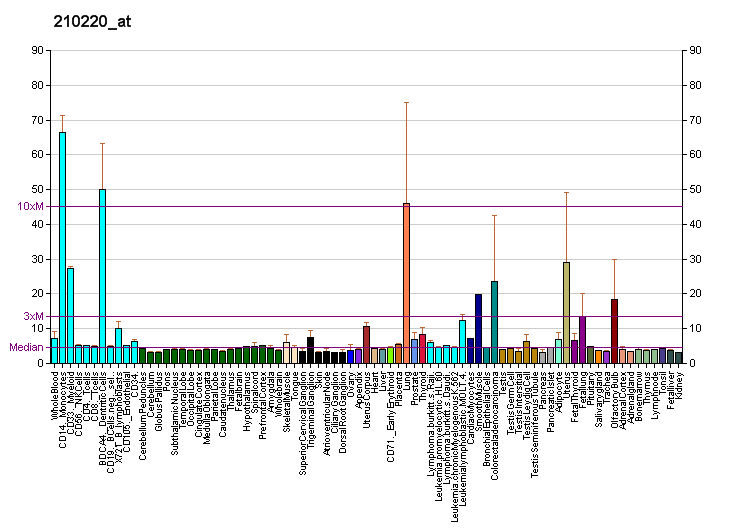
RNA expression pattern
Bgee	Human / Mouse (ortholog); Top expressed in: ventricular zone; embryo; spinal ganglia; ganglionic eminence; stromal cell of endometrium; trigeminal ganglion; glomerulus; metanephric glomerulus; retinal pigment epithelium; right coronary artery / Top expressed in: external carotid artery; internal carotid artery; ureter; medullary collecting duct; mandibular prominence; vas deferens; fossa; maxillary prominence; condyle; ascending aorta; More reference expression data
BioGPS	More reference expression data
Gene ontology
Molecular function	PDZ domain binding; signal transducer activity; protein binding; transmembrane signaling receptor activity; G protein-coupled receptor activity; Wnt-protein binding; Wnt-activated receptor activity
Cellular component	cytoplasm; clathrin-coated endocytic vesicle membrane; membrane; focal adhesion; plasma membrane; integral component of membrane
Biological process	G protein-coupled receptor signaling pathway; epithelial cell differentiation; muscular septum morphogenesis; ventricular septum morphogenesis; cell-cell signaling; membranous septum morphogenesis; outflow tract morphogenesis; positive regulation of DNA-binding transcription factor activity; Wnt signaling pathway; planar cell polarity pathway involved in neural tube closure; positive regulation of transcription, DNA-templated; multicellular organism development; sensory perception of smell; cell surface receptor signaling pathway; inner ear receptor cell development; hard palate development; cochlea morphogenesis; neuron differentiation; canonical Wnt signaling pathway; signal transduction; beta-catenin destruction complex disassembly; Wnt signaling pathway, calcium modulating pathway; Wnt signaling pathway, planar cell polarity pathway; non-canonical Wnt signaling pathway; positive regulation of G protein-coupled receptor signaling pathway
Sources:Amigo / QuickGO
Orthologs
Databases	NCBI: entry; OMA: entry
Species	Human	Mouse
Entrez	2535	57265
Ensembl	ENSG00000180340	ENSMUSG00000050288
UniProt	Q14332	Q9JIP6
RefSeq (mRNA)	NM_001466	NM_020510
RefSeq (protein)	NP_001457	NP_065256
Location (UCSC)	Chr 17: 44.56 – 44.56 Mb	Chr 11: 102.5 – 102.5 Mb
PubMed search
- Wikidata
View/Edit Human	View/Edit Mouse

Frizzled-2 (Fz-2) is a protein that in humans is encoded by the FZD2 gene.

Members of the 'frizzled' gene family encode 7-transmembrane domain proteins that are receptors for Wnt signaling proteins. The expression of the FZD2 gene appears to be developmentally regulated, with high levels of expression in fetal kidney and lung and in adult colon and ovary.
