= Secreted frizzled-related protein 1 =

Protein-coding gene in the species Homo sapiens

SFRP1

Identifiers
- Aliases: SFRP1, FRP, FRP-1, FRP1, FrzA, SARP2, secreted frizzled related protein 1
- External IDs: OMIM: 604156; MGI: 892014; HomoloGene: 2266; GeneCards: SFRP1; OMA:SFRP1 - orthologs

Gene location (Human)
Chr.	Chromosome 8 (human)
Band	8p11.21	Start	41,261,962 bp
Band	8p11.21	End	41,309,473 bp

Gene location (Mouse)
Chr.	Chromosome 8 (mouse)
Band	8 A2|8 11.48 cM	Start	23,901,518 bp
Band	8 A2|8 11.48 cM	End	23,939,648 bp
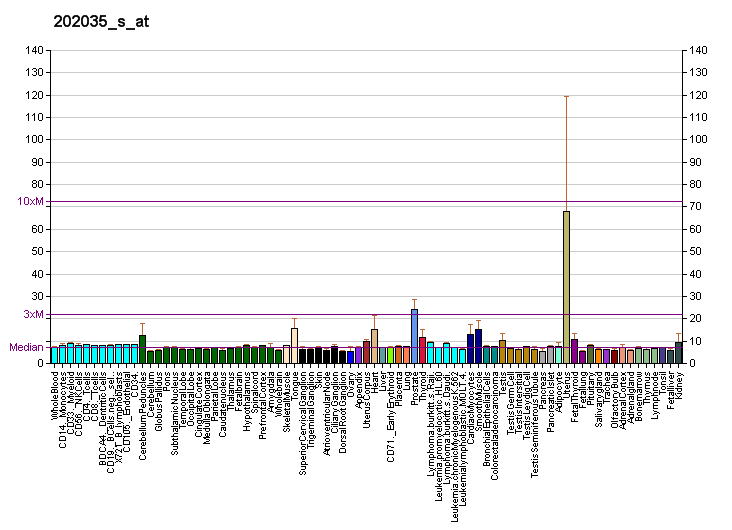

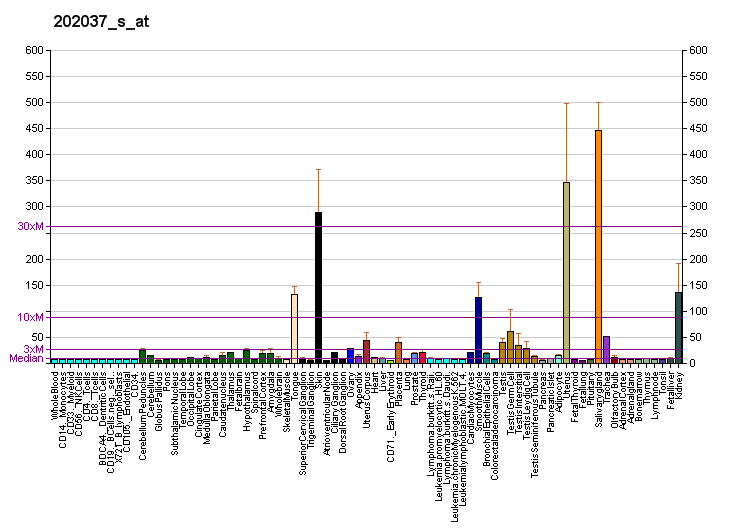

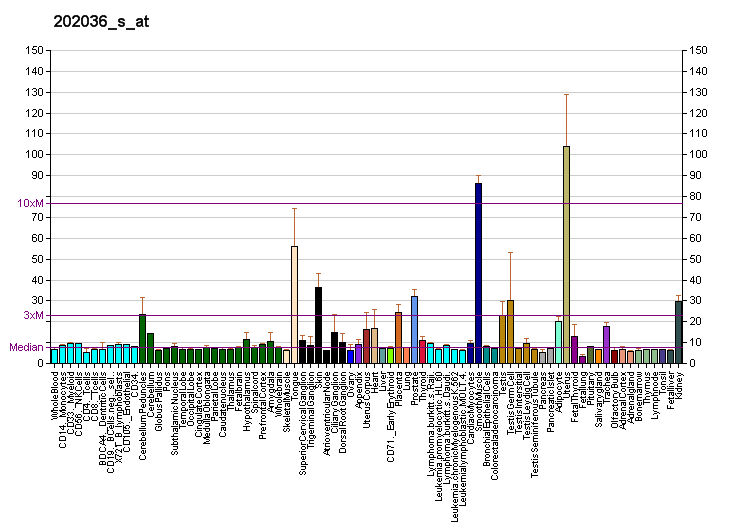
RNA expression pattern
Bgee	Human / Mouse (ortholog); Top expressed in: ventricular zone; parotid gland; lactiferous duct; Epithelium of choroid plexus; ganglionic eminence; hair follicle; renal medulla; nipple; synovial joint; vena cava / Top expressed in: epithelium of lens; efferent ductule; ventricular zone; Gonadal ridge; retinal pigment epithelium; ciliary body; corneal stroma; vas deferens; stroma of bone marrow; atrium; More reference expression data
BioGPS	More reference expression data
Gene ontology
Molecular function	frizzled binding; protein binding; cysteine-type endopeptidase activity; identical protein binding; heparin binding; Wnt-protein binding; G protein-coupled receptor activity; Wnt-activated receptor activity
Cellular component	extracellular region; extracellular exosome; cell surface; intracellular anatomical structure; extracellular matrix; plasma membrane; cytosol; extracellular space; integral component of membrane; collagen-containing extracellular matrix
Biological process	positive regulation of smoothened signaling pathway; cellular response to fibroblast growth factor stimulus; development of primary male sexual characteristics; somatic stem cell population maintenance; Wnt signaling pathway involved in somitogenesis; negative regulation of JUN kinase activity; somitogenesis; negative regulation of androgen receptor signaling pathway; menstrual cycle phase; negative regulation of bone remodeling; digestive tract morphogenesis; negative regulation of fibroblast apoptotic process; negative regulation of fibroblast proliferation; hematopoietic progenitor cell differentiation; negative regulation of epithelial cell proliferation; positive regulation of cell-matrix adhesion; cellular response to X-ray; cellular response to starvation; bone trabecula formation; cellular response to estradiol stimulus; positive regulation of GTPase activity; positive regulation of Wnt signaling pathway; dopaminergic neuron differentiation; cellular response to interleukin-1; positive regulation of non-canonical Wnt signaling pathway; positive regulation of cell population proliferation; positive regulation of stress fiber assembly; cellular response to hypoxia; regulation of branching involved in prostate gland morphogenesis; negative regulation of canonical Wnt signaling pathway involved in controlling type B pancreatic cell proliferation; response to organic cyclic compound; negative regulation of cell migration; negative regulation of transcription, DNA-templated; negative regulation of osteoblast differentiation; negative regulation of epithelial to mesenchymal transition; negative regulation of BMP signaling pathway; negative regulation of peptidyl-tyrosine phosphorylation; positive regulation of extrinsic apoptotic signaling pathway; positive regulation of cell growth; regulation of cell cycle process; cellular response to vitamin D; hematopoietic stem cell differentiation; regulation of angiogenesis; male gonad development; dorsal/ventral axis specification; negative regulation of osteoclast differentiation; Wnt signaling pathway, planar cell polarity pathway; neural crest cell fate commitment; positive regulation of focal adhesion assembly; positive regulation of extrinsic apoptotic signaling pathway via death domain receptors; negative regulation of planar cell polarity pathway involved in axis elongation; hemopoiesis; ureteric bud development; cellular response to BMP stimulus; neural tube development; cell differentiation; negative regulation of insulin secretion; osteoblast differentiation; positive regulation of fat cell differentiation; cellular response to transforming growth factor beta stimulus; stromal-epithelial cell signaling involved in prostate gland development; Wnt signaling pathway; cellular response to heparin; positive regulation of apoptotic process; cellular response to growth factor stimulus; positive regulation of fibroblast apoptotic process; canonical Wnt signaling pathway; negative regulation of cell growth; positive regulation of transcription, DNA-templated; convergent extension involved in somitogenesis; multicellular organism development; negative regulation of Wnt signaling pathway involved in dorsal/ventral axis specification; prostate epithelial cord arborization involved in prostate glandular acinus morphogenesis; planar cell polarity pathway involved in neural tube closure; negative regulation of osteoblast proliferation; anterior/posterior pattern specification; negative regulation of B cell differentiation; regulation of establishment of planar polarity; cellular response to tumor necrosis factor; female gonad development; negative regulation of cell population proliferation; negative regulation of apoptotic process; positive regulation of epithelial cell proliferation; neural tube closure; positive regulation of canonical Wnt signaling pathway; negative regulation of Wnt signaling pathway; negative regulation of ossification; negative regulation of gene expression; cellular response to estrogen stimulus; regulation of midbrain dopaminergic neuron differentiation; regulation of neuron projection development; cellular response to prostaglandin E stimulus; negative regulation of canonical Wnt signaling pathway; proteolysis; G protein-coupled receptor signaling pathway; non-canonical Wnt signaling pathway
Sources:Amigo / QuickGO
Orthologs
Species	Human	Mouse
Entrez	6422	20377
Ensembl	ENSG00000104332	ENSMUSG00000031548
UniProt	Q8N474	Q8C4U3
RefSeq (mRNA)	NM_003012	NM_013834
RefSeq (protein)	NP_003003	NP_038862
Location (UCSC)	Chr 8: 41.26 – 41.31 Mb	Chr 8: 23.9 – 23.94 Mb
PubMed search
- Wikidata
View/Edit Human	View/Edit Mouse

Secreted frizzled-related protein 1, also known as SFRP1, is a protein which in humans is encoded by the SFRP1 gene.

== Function ==
Secreted frizzled-related protein 1 (SFRP1) is a member of the SFRP family that contains a cysteine-rich domain homologous to the putative Wnt-binding site of Frizzled proteins. SFRPs act as soluble modulators of Wnt signaling. SFRP1 and SFRP5 may be involved in determining the polarity of photoreceptor cells in the retina. SFRP1 is expressed in several human tissues, with the highest levels in the heart.

The Secreted frizzled-related protein (SFRP) family consists of five secreted glycoproteins in humans (SFRP1, SFRP2, SFRP3, SFRP4, SFRP5) that act as extracellular signaling ligands. Each SFRP is ~300 amino acids in length and contains a cysteine-rich domain (CRD) that shares 30–50% sequence homology with the CRD of Frizzled (Fz) receptors. SFRPs are able to bind Wnt proteins and Fz receptors in the extracellular compartment. The interaction between SFRPs and Wnt proteins prevents the latter from binding the Fz receptors. SFRPs are also able to downregulate Wnt signaling by the formation of an inhibitory complex with the Frizzled receptors. The Wnt pathway plays a key role in embryonic development, cell differentiation and cell proliferation. It has been shown that the deregulation of this critical developmental pathway occurs in several human tumor entities.

SFRP1 is a 35 kDa prototypical member of the SFRP family. It acts as a biphasic modulator of Wnt signaling, counteracting Wnt-induced effects at high concentrations and promoting them at lower concentrations. It is located in a chromosomal region (8p12-p11.1) that is frequently deleted in breast cancer and is thought to harbour a tumor suppressor gene.

=== Tumor suppression ===
There are 3 types of tumor suppressor genes:

- Genes that affect cell growth
- Genes that limit the cell cycle and induce apoptosis
- Genes that repair damaged DNA

SFRP1 appears to fall in the first category of genes, those that affect cell growth.

The role of SFRP1 as a tumor suppressor has been proposed in many cancers, based on its loss in patient tumors. Its frequent inactivation by methylation-induced silencing is consistent with it behaving as a tumor suppressor. Also, the SFRP1 gene is located in a region on chromosome 8 that is frequently lost in many cancer types. Expression levels of several targets of the Wnt signaling pathways are increased in tumor tissue compared with normal, and the expression of SFRP1 is lost in patient tumor samples. The role for the Wnt/β-catenin signaling in cancer has been well defined: β-catenin drives transcription of genes that contribute to the tumor phenotype by regulating processes such as proliferation, survival and invasion.

Gumz et al. showed that SFRP1 expression in UMRC3 cells (clear cell renal cell carcinoma cell line) resulted in a growth-inhibited phenotype. SFRP1 expression not only reduced the expression of Wnt target genes, but also markedly inhibited tumor cell growth in culture, soft agar and xenografts in athymic nude mice. Growth in culture and anchorage-independent growth were inhibited in SFRP1-expressing UMRC3 cells. The growth-inhibitory effects of SFRP1 were due primarily to decreased cell proliferation rather than an increase in apoptosis. This was consistent with the effect of SFRP1 on cellular proliferation as seen in prostate cancer, where retroviral-mediated expression of SFRP1 resulted in inhibited cellular proliferation but had no effect on apoptosis. Also, restoration of SFRP1 expression attenuated the malignant phenotype of cRCC; moreover, other studies showed reexpression of SFRP1 resulted in decreased colony formation in colon and lung cancer models.

=== Wnt-dependent signaling ===
The Wnt signaling pathways are initiated by the binding of the Wnt ligand to the Fz receptor. There are three different molecular pathways downstream of the Wnt/Fz interaction. The majority of research has focused on the Wnt/β-catenin pathway (also known as the "canonical" Wnt pathway), which manages cell fate determination by regulating gene expression. The Wnt/Ca^{2+} and Wnt/polarity pathways are known as the "non-canonical pathways". The decision of which pathway is activated most likely depends on which Wnt ligand and Fz receptor are present, as well as the cellular context. Nineteen Wnt ligands and ten different members of the Fz seven-transmembrane receptor family have been described in the human genome. As a result, a large variety of responses could be initiated from the Wnt/Fz interactions.

The Wnt/β-catenin pathway starts with the binding of Wnt to a receptor complex encompassing a Fz receptor and LRP co-receptor. After Wnt binds, an intracellular protein named Dishevelled (Dvl) is activated via phosphorylation. β-catenin degradation complexes in the cytoplasm are composed of adenomatous polyposis coli (APC), glycogen synthase kinase 3β (GSK3β) and Axin. APC promotes the degradation of β-catenin by increasing the affinity of the degradation complex to β-catenin. Axin is a scaffolding protein which holds the degradation complex together. The activated Dvl associates with Axin and prevents GSK3β and casein kinase 1α (CK1α) from phosphorylating critical substrates, such as β-catenin. Phosphorylation of β-catenin marks the protein for ubiquitylation and rapid degradation by proteasomes. Thus, the binding of Wnt to the receptor results in a non-phosphorylated form of β-catenin which localizes to the nucleus and, after displacing the Groucho corepressor protein, forms a complex with Tcf/Lef transcription factors and co-activators (such as CREB binding protein) and induces the expression of downstream target genes.

β-catenin is actively stabilized in over 50% of breast cancers and its nuclear localization correlates with poor patient prognosis. Several target genes of the Wnt signaling pathway, such as cyclin D1, are activated in a significant proportion of breast tumours. It has been shown that SFRP1 transcription can be driven by B-catenin in normal intestinal epithelial cells. Neoplastic epithelial cells were treated with lithium chloride, which inhibits GSK3B and thus stabilizes B-catenin. Lithium chloride is widely used to mimic Wnt signaling. Rather than suppressing SFRP1 expression, B-catenin/TCF activity was associated with the induction of SFRP1. This is consistent with a negative feedback response restricting the exposure of a normal cell to a prolonged Wnt growth factor signal.

Hedgehog signaling in the intestinal epithelium represses the canonical Wnt signaling to restrict expression of Wnt target genes to stem or progenitor cells. It was thought that the Hedgehog signaling pathway does this via the induction of the secreted-type Wnt inhibitor. Katoh et al. searched for the GLI-binding site within the promoter region of Wnt inhibitor genes. GLI are transcription factors that activate the transcription of Hedgehog target genes. The GLI-binding site was identified within the 5’-flanking promoter region of the human SFRP1 gene. The GLI-binding site was conserved among promoter regions of mammalian SFRP1 orthologs. These facts indicate that the SFRP1 gene was identified as the evolutionarily conserved target of the Hedgehog-GLI signaling pathway. SFRP1 was found to be expressed in mesenchymal cells. Hedgehog is secreted from differentiated epithelial cells to induce SFRP1 expression in mesenchymal cells, which keeps differentiated epithelial cells away from the effect of canonical Wnt signaling. Thus, SFRP1 is most likely the Hedgehog target to confine canonical Wnt signaling within stem or progenitor cells. Epigenetic CpG hypermethylation of the SFRP1 promoter during chronic persistent inflammation and aging leads to the occurrence of gastrointestinal cancers, such as colorectal cancer and gastric cancer, through the breakdown of Hedgehog-dependent Wnt signal inhibition.

== Genome instability ==
Regions of the short arm of chromosome 8 are frequently deleted in a range of solid tumors, indicating that tumor suppressor genes reside at these loci. Caldwell et al. have shown frequent interstitial deletions in a series of prostate cancers, squamous cell head and neck cancers and colorectal carcinomas. There was also an association between 8p11.2 deletion and local invasion.

The first coding exon contains the whole of the frizzled-related cysteine rich domain (CRD), while the third exon (COOH-terminal domain) contains the netrin-related domain. Netrin is a regulator of apoptosis; the SFRP1 netrin-related motif is also found in a range of other proteins that is thought to mediate protein-protein interactions. The middle exon most likely represents a spacer between the first and third exon. There are 2 introns present within the coding sequence of SFRP1.

=== Protein-truncating mutations in tumor DNA ===
Three out of 10 advanced colorectal tumors had mutations leading to premature termination of the SFRP1 translation product. The mutations were two single-base deletions (26delG and 67delG) and a single-base change (G450A), which generates an in-frame stop codon. These three mutations were found within the first exon, which was shown previously to be sufficient for Wnt antagonist activity by itself [26, 32]. Of the 10 tumors analyzed, no truncating mutations were found in the second or third exons of SFRP1.

An additional 51 tumors were analyzed via direct sequence analysis, yielding 49 clearly interpretable results. Only the first exon was sequenced for stop codon mutations, but none were found. This indicates that point mutation is not a frequent method of inactivation of the SFRP1 gene in colorectal cancer.

=== Common exon 1 polymorphism ===
The primary translation product of SFRP1 contains an atypical signaling sequence, where a chain of 15 hydrophilic amino acids precede the hydrophobic domain. Looking at 7 tumors without the truncating mutation, the retained SFRP1 allele contained an in-frame three-base insertion after nucleotide 37. This is thought to lead to an extra alanine in the protein after codon 13. However, no significant association was found between the development of colorectal cancer and the presence of the 3-bp insertion.

=== Alternatively spliced 3’ end ===
An unspliced form of SFRP1 is the dominant form in the lung and liver, leading to an extended protein. This extended sequence contains a hydrophobic region that may act as a transmembrane anchor, modifying the localization of the protein. This may then influence the function of SFRP1 in different tissues because an untethered protein may be more effective in antagonizing Wnt signaling to tumor cells than would a membrane-bound form.

== Epigenetics ==
=== Downregulated expression in several kinds of malignancy ===
- NSCLC (48% of investigated cell lines)
- SCLC (38% of investigated cell lines)
- Bladder cancers (38%)
- Breast cancers (46%)
- Malignant mesotheliomas (48%)
- Colorectal cancers (76%)

=== Mechanism of down regulation ===
DNA methylation involves the addition of a methyl group to the carbon-5 position of the cytosine ring in the CpG dinucleotide and converting it to methylcytosine. This process is catalyzed by DNA methyltransferase. In numerous cancers, the CpG islands of selected genes are aberrantly methylated (hypermethylated) which results in transcriptional repression. This may be an alternate mechanism of gene inactivation.

Multiple genes have been discovered to be frequently methylated in cancers and leukemias. More specifically, the deregulation of the Wnt signaling pathway has been implicated in a wide array of cancers that is mainly seen as a result of loss-of-function mutations of APC and axin or as a gain-of-function mutation of CTNNB1 (B-catenin). The GC content of the SFRP1 promoter in humans is 56.3%.

It has been found that the overexpression of B-catenin may lead to enhanced proliferation in myeloma plasma cells; thus, soluble Wnt inhibitors are potential tumor suppressor genes and, if inactivated, may contribute to myeloma pathogenesis. This led Chim et al. to investigate the role of aberrant gene methylation of a panel of soluble Wnt antagonists, including SFRP1. Complete methylation led to silencing of respective genes (no transcripts), whereas absence of gene methylation was associated with constitutive gene expression. Methylation of soluble Wnt antagonists would be important in the pathogenesis of multiple myeloma if Wnt signaling was regulated by an autocrine loop by Wnt and Fz. If an autocrine loops exists, then both the ligand (Wz) and receptor (Fzd) should be simultaneously expressed in myeloma cells and growth of tumour cells should be inhibited upon addition of SFRP1. Chim et al. demonstrated simultaneous expression of Wz and Fzd in myeloma plasma cells. Moreover, treatment with recombinant SFRP1 inhibited the growth of myeloma cells in a dose-dependent manner. These findings implicate soluble Wnt inhibitors as tumor suppressors that could be inactivated by methylation.

Veeck and colleagues found all of their eight breast cancer cell lines had complete methylation in the SFRP1 promoter region, while no methylation was detectable in non-malignant cell lines. After treatment with 5-Aza-2’-deoxycytidine (DAC), an inhibitor of DNA methyltransferase, SFRP1 expression was restored in all four treated breast cancer cell lines, supporting the hypothesis of methylation-mediated SFRP1 gene silencing in breast cancer.

Furthermore, the transcriptional silencing mechanism underlying DNA methylation which is brought about through the hypermethylation of CpG-rich islands present in the promoter region of genes, can cooperate with histone deacetylation to change chromatin structure to a repressed form. Lo and colleagues looked at the effects of DAC and trichostatin A (TSA, selectively inhibits the mammalian histone deacetylase family of enzymes) on cancer cells. In 4 breast cancer cell lines, SFRP1 expression was significantly restored after treatment with DAC alone. TSA, only in combination with DAC, had a slightly enhanced effect on SFRP1 expression in these cell lines. A different breast cancer cell line (SKBR3, showed loss of SFRP1 expression without significant methylation of the SFRP1 promoter. Lo et al. hypothesized that this may be due to silencing via histone deacetylation. After SKBR3 cells were treated with TSA, SFRP1 expression was restored in a dose- and time-dependent manner. Yet another breast cancer cell line (T47D) required both DAC and TSA to upregulate SFRP1 expression. This indicates that T47D cells are tightly regulated by two layers of epigenetic control (DNA methylation and histion deacetylation) and relieving inhibition by both mechanisms is necessary for reactivation of SFRP1. This study shows that both the epigenetic mechanisms, DNA methylation and histone deacetylation, are involved in silencing of SFRP1.

== Hormones ==
Uterine leiomyomas are the most common tumors found in the female genital tract. Leiomyomas have been reported to grow under the influence of ovarian steroids (estrogen and progesterone). Aberrations of wnt signaling, as well as SFRPs, can contribute to the neoplastic process. This led Fukuhara et al. to investigate whether SFRP1 is associated with the pathogenesis of uterine leiomyomas by analyzing mRNA and protein expression of SFRP1 in leiomyomas and matched normal myometrium. The following outlines their findings:

=== Expression in normal myometrium and leiomyoma ===
Twenty-three out of 25 patients showed high expression of SFRP1 mRNA in leiomyoma than the matched normal myometrium. During the menstrual cycle, the level of SFRP1 mRNA in leiomyoma was highest in the follicular phase. Gonadotropin releasing hormone analogue (GnRHa) decreases estrogen secretion from the ovary. Patients treated with (GnRHa) presurgically showed the lowest expression of SFRP1 in both myometrial and leiomyoma tissues. These findings suggest that SFRP1 could be under the control of estrogen. Gene expression of estrogen receptors in leiomyomas is stronger than that in the myometrium. This suggests that leiomyoma possess increased sensitivity to E2 (estradiol, a form of estrogen) and the estrogen-dependent expression of SFRP1 in leiomyoma could be associated with the growth and pathogenesis of leiomyoma.

=== Expression after estrogen or progesterone treatment ===
Smooth muscle cells cultured from the myometrium showed no significant induction of SFRP1 mRNA in response to treatment with E2 and/or progesterone. Conversely, cells cultured from leiomyomas showed significant dose-dependent induction of SFRP1 mRNA in response to treatment with E2; however, progesterone had no effect on SFRP1 even when coapplied with E2.

=== Effect of proliferation, serum deprivation and hypoxia on expression ===
Both hypoxic conditions and serum deprivation induced increased expression of SFRP1 in leiomyoma cells. However, the smooth muscle cells cultured from the myometrium showed no significant correlation between SFRP1 expression and oxygen concentration. This suggests that SFRP1 may protect the cells from the damage caused by these stresses.

== Angiogenesis ==
The formation of new blood capillaries is an important component of pathological tissue repair in response to ischemia. The angiogenic process is complex and involves endothelial cell (EC) movement and proliferation.

SFRP1 has been shown to have a role in new vascularization after an ischemic event and as a potent angiogenic factor. In vitro SFRP1 modulated the EC angiogenic response (migration, differentiation) and in vivo SFRP1 stimulated neovascularization in plug or tumor models. The directed movements of EC during de novo vessel formation are coordinated through cellular adhesion mechanisms, cytoskeletal reorganization and by association with elevated expression of angiogenic factors such as, the key factor, vascular endothelial growth factor. The regulation of the EC cytoskeleton is critical to EC spreading and motility. SFRP1 was found to have a major role in mediating EC spreading by regulating reorganization of the actin network and focal contact formations.

In vivo data supports a critical role for SFRP1 in ischemia-induced angiogenesis in adults. Using adenovirus-expressing SFRP1, impaired the canonical Wnt/Fzd pathway in the early phase of ischemia and as a result reduced vascular cell proliferation and delayed vessel formation. When SFRP1 was induced specifically in ECs along the kinetics of ischemia repair, a biphasic response was seen: a delay in capillary formation until day 15 and then an increase in vascular formation at day 25. This indicates that SFRP1 can fine tune the outcome of Wnt/Fzd signaling at different steps in the course of neovessel formation.

== Clinical relevance ==
Loss of SFRP1 protein expression is associated with poor overall survival (OS) in patients with early breast cancer (pT1 tumours); this indicates that SFRP1 may be a putative tumor suppressor gene. SFRP1 methylation has been shown to be an independent risk factor for OS. Veeck and colleagues demonstrate, via Kaplan-Meier analysis, that clear SFRP1 promoter methylation is associated with unfavourable prognosis. Furthermore, a correlation between SFRP1 methylation and OS in breast cancer is dependent on a gene dose effect. In order for the OS to be affected, a sufficient amount of tumour cells may be required to lose SFRP1 expression due to promoter methylation.

== As a drug target ==
Heparin and heparan sulfate (HS) are mammalian glycosaminoglycans with the highest negative charge density of known biological macromolecules. They bind by ionic interactions with a variety of proteins. Heparin is widely used as an injectable anticoagulant. SFRP1 are heparin-binding proteins, with the heparin-binding domain within the C-terminal region of the SFRP1 protein. In vitro studies show that SFRP1 is stabilized by heparin, suggesting that heparin or endogenous heparan-sulfate proteoglycan (HSPG) has the potential to promote SFRP1/Wnt binding by serving as a scaffold to facilitate interaction between SFRP1 and Wnt proteins. Lowering HSPG levels in tissue have been shown to impair Wnt signaling in vivo, supporting the idea that HSPG plays an important role in Wnt signaling regulation. Furthermore, SFRP1 is tyrosine-sulfated at two N-terminal tyrosines; this modification is, however, inhibited by heparin. Tyrosine sulfation could partially destabilize the SFRP1 protein, which is supported by previous studies showing that SFRP1 is susceptible to degradation in the absence of heparin. The finding that heparin can inhibit intracellular post-translational modification of SFRP1 was surprising. This indicates that heparin may inhibit the process of tyrosine sulfation, for example, by tyrosyl-protein sulfotransferases enzymes or sulfate donor pathways. Since heparin is highly negatively charged and cannot permeate the membrane, it must activate a signal transduction pathway to carry out its effect. It is well known that fibroblast growth factors (FGFs) bind heparin with relatively high affinity. HSPGs have also been shown to be involved in FGF cell signaling. Zhong et al. revealed a specificity of FGFs and FGF receptors on SFRP1 accumulation, demonstrating that FGF and their receptors are involved in post-translational modification of SFRP1. As stated above, SFRP1 has been shown to attenuate the malignant phenotype and decrease the growth of tumors. Thus, Heparin is a potential drug that could be used to stabilize and accumulate SFRP1 in cancer cells.

=== As a biomarker ===
Aberrant promoter hypermethylation of SFRP1 occurs frequently during the pathogenesis of human cancers and has been found to be one of the primary mechanisms in SFRP1 down-regulation. Methylation-specific PCR (MSP) is able to detect this epigenetic change and could be used for cancer detection. Detection and quantification of promoter CpG methylation in body fluid is both feasible and noninvasive. Combined MSP analyses of multiple genes in voided urine could provide a reliable way to improve cancer diagnosis.

Urakami et al. were able to detect cancers cells using conventional MSP analysis of Wnt-antagonist genes (including SFRP1) in voided urine of patients with bladder tumor. Their results showed a high percentage of identical methylation with tumor-tissue DNA. Conversely, no aberrant methylation was detected in >90% of urine DNA from normal controls. This demonstrates that methylation detection of SFRP1 is both feasible and reliable and that the urine methylation score (M score) of Wnt antagonist genes could be used as an excellent noninvasive diagnostic biomarker for bladder tumor. Furthermore, the M score of Wnt-antagonist genes may reflect the presence of bladder tumor that progresses to invasive disease that would signal for future aggressive treatment. An optimal hypermethylation panel of Wnt-antagonist genes could contribute significantly to early detection of bladder tumor and predict bladder tumor aggressiveness. In fact, the methylation of SFRP1 genes in fecal DNA isolated from stool samples has been used to screen for colorectal cancer.

=== Immunotherapy ===
Immunotherapy is a treatment used to produce immunity to a disease or enhance the resistance of the immune system to an active disease process, such as cancer

Wnt and Fz genes are frequently overexpressed in head and neck squamous cell carcinoma (HNSCC). Treatment of a HNSCC cell line (SNU 1076) with anti-Wnt1 antibodies reduced the activity of the Wnt/Fz dependent transcription factor LEF/TCF and diminished the expression of cyclin D1 and B-catenin proteins. Similar to anti-Wnt antibodies, treatment with recombinant SFRP1 inhibited growth of SNU 1076 cells as well. This suggests that Wnt and Fz receptors may be attractive targets for immunotherapy and drug therapy of HNSCC.

=== Epigenetic Therapy ===
Epigenetic Therapy is the use of drugs or other epigenome-influencing techniques to treat medical conditions.

It is recently regarded as promising therapy to NSCLC. As can be seen in the above, SFRP1 was downregulated epigenetically in NSCLC and was recently proposed as one of epigenetic therapy target.

== Interactions ==
Secreted frizzled-related protein 1 has been shown to interact with FZD6.
