= Frizzled-7 =

Protein found in humans

FZD7

Identifiers
- Aliases: FZD7, FzE3, frizzled class receptor 7
- External IDs: OMIM: 603410; MGI: 108570; GeneCards: FZD7
Available structures
PDB	Ortholog search: PDBe RCSB
PDB	List of PDB id codes 4Z33

Gene location (Human)
Chr.	Chromosome 2 (human)
Band	2q33.1	Start	202,033,855 bp
Band	2q33.1	End	202,038,441 bp

Gene location (Mouse)
Chr.	Chromosome 1 (mouse)
Band	1 C2|1 30.08 cM	Start	59,521,583 bp
Band	1 C2|1 30.08 cM	End	59,526,114 bp
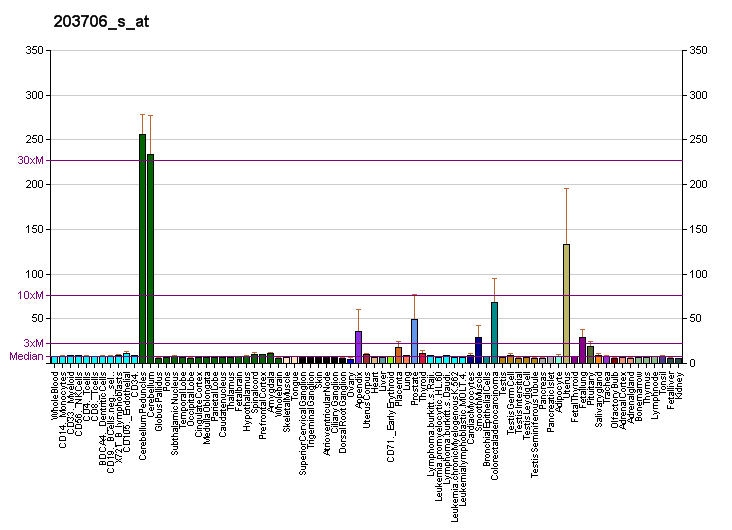

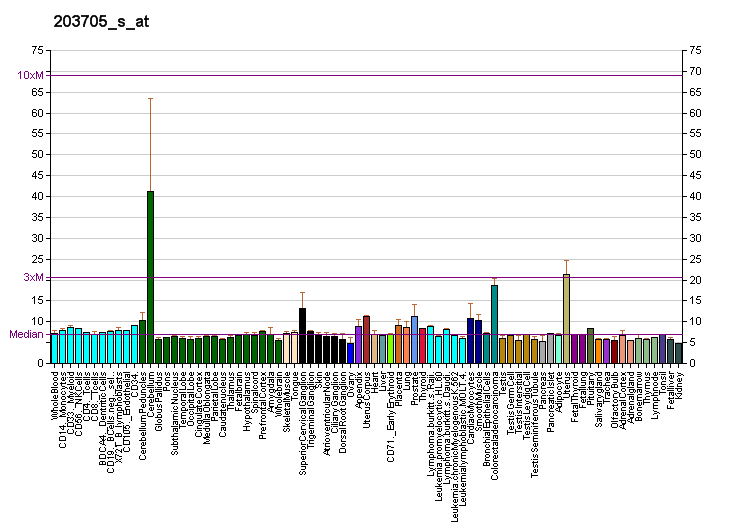
RNA expression pattern
Bgee	Human / Mouse (ortholog); Top expressed in: hair follicle; germinal epithelium; urethra; lactiferous duct; tibia; parotid gland; cerebellar vermis; parietal pleura; cardiac muscle tissue of right atrium; seminal vesicula / Top expressed in: vestibular membrane of cochlear duct; medullary collecting duct; renal corpuscle; ascending aorta; vestibular sensory epithelium; Epithelium of choroid plexus; aortic valve; saccule; triceps brachii muscle; masseter muscle; More reference expression data
BioGPS	More reference expression data
Gene ontology
Molecular function	PDZ domain binding; frizzled binding; signal transducer activity; Wnt-protein binding; protein binding; transmembrane signaling receptor activity; phosphatidylinositol-4,5-bisphosphate binding; G protein-coupled receptor activity; Wnt-activated receptor activity
Cellular component	integral component of membrane; membrane; plasma membrane; recycling endosome membrane; endosome; endosome membrane
Biological process	negative regulation of cell-substrate adhesion; cellular response to retinoic acid; G protein-coupled receptor signaling pathway; non-canonical Wnt signaling pathway; regulation of transcription, DNA-templated; positive regulation of epithelial cell proliferation involved in wound healing; T cell differentiation in thymus; non-canonical Wnt signaling pathway via JNK cascade; negative regulation of ectodermal cell fate specification; somatic stem cell division; positive regulation of JNK cascade; Wnt signaling pathway; stem cell population maintenance; positive regulation of transcription, DNA-templated; multicellular organism development; cell surface receptor signaling pathway; skeletal muscle satellite cell maintenance involved in skeletal muscle regeneration; neuron differentiation; canonical Wnt signaling pathway; substrate adhesion-dependent cell spreading; positive regulation of phosphorylation; signal transduction; mesenchymal to epithelial transition; Wnt signaling pathway, planar cell polarity pathway; negative regulation of cardiac muscle cell differentiation; regulation of canonical Wnt signaling pathway
Sources:Amigo / QuickGO
Orthologs
Databases	NCBI: entry; OMA: entry
Species	Human	Mouse
Entrez	8324	14369
Ensembl	ENSG00000155760	ENSMUSG00000041075
UniProt	O75084	Q61090
RefSeq (mRNA)	NM_003507	NM_008057
RefSeq (protein)	NP_003498	NP_032083
Location (UCSC)	Chr 2: 202.03 – 202.04 Mb	Chr 1: 59.52 – 59.53 Mb
PubMed search
- Wikidata
View/Edit Human	View/Edit Mouse

Frizzled-7 (Fd-7) is a protein that in humans is encoded by the FZD7 gene.

Members of the 'frizzled' gene family encode 7-transmembrane domain proteins that are receptors for Wnt signaling proteins. The FZD7 protein contains an N-terminal signal sequence, 10 cysteine residues typical of the cysteine-rich extracellular domain of Fz family members, 7 putative transmembrane domains, and an intracellular C-terminal tail with a PDZ domain-binding motif. FZD7 gene expression may downregulate APC function and enhance beta-catenin-mediated signals in poorly differentiated human esophageal carcinomas.

== Interactions ==
Fz-7 has been shown to interact with DLG4.
