= Frizzled-1 =

Protein-coding gene in the species Homo sapiens

FZD1

Identifiers
- Aliases: FZD1, frizzled class receptor 1
- External IDs: OMIM: 603408; MGI: 1196625; GeneCards: FZD1

Gene location (Human)
Chr.	Chromosome 7 (human)
Band	7q21.13	Start	91,264,433 bp
Band	7q21.13	End	91,271,326 bp

Gene location (Mouse)
Chr.	Chromosome 5 (mouse)
Band	5 A1|5 2.61 cM	Start	4,803,839 bp
Band	5 A1|5 2.61 cM	End	4,808,035 bp
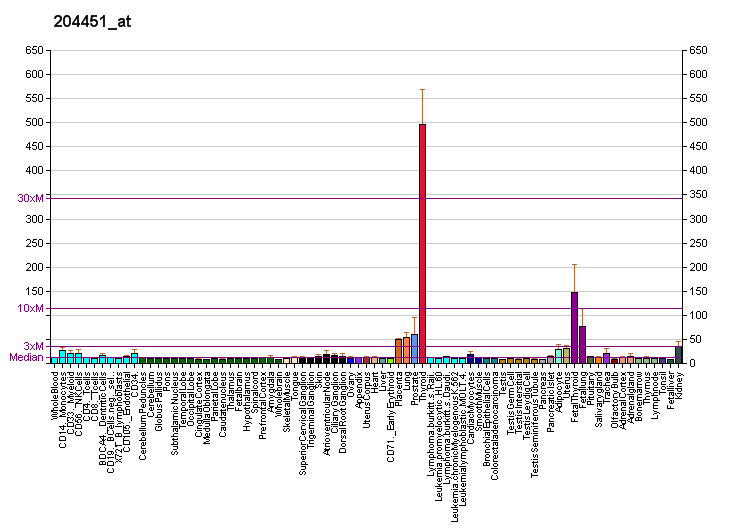

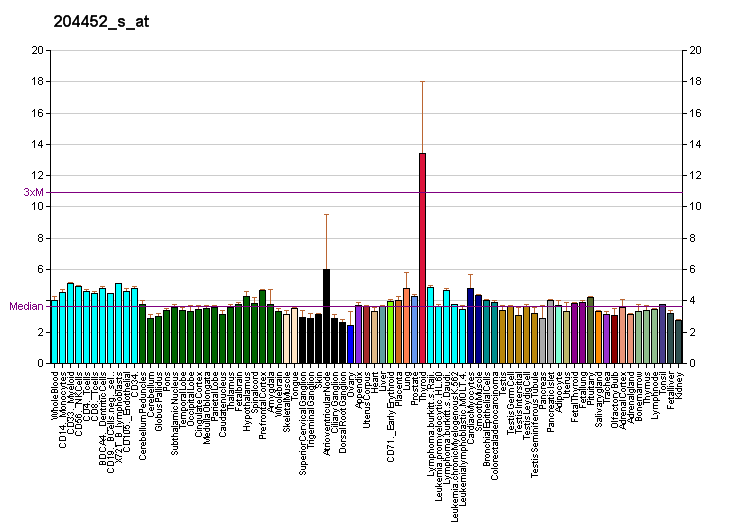
RNA expression pattern
Bgee	Human / Mouse (ortholog); Top expressed in: lactiferous duct; visceral pleura; tail of epididymis; tendon of biceps brachii; Epithelium of choroid plexus; parietal pleura; trigeminal ganglion; superficial temporal artery; hair follicle; spinal ganglia / Top expressed in: gastrula; calvaria; vas deferens; umbilical cord; habenula; hair follicle; aortic valve; decidua; ascending aorta; endocardial cushion; More reference expression data
BioGPS	More reference expression data
Gene ontology
Molecular function	PDZ domain binding; frizzled binding; signal transducer activity; Wnt-protein binding; protein binding; Wnt-activated receptor activity; signaling receptor binding; transmembrane signaling receptor activity; G protein-coupled receptor activity
Cellular component	Wnt signalosome; membrane; focal adhesion; plasma membrane; cell surface; integral component of membrane
Biological process	G protein-coupled receptor signaling pathway; positive regulation of protein phosphorylation; autocrine signaling; epithelial cell differentiation; muscular septum morphogenesis; ventricular septum morphogenesis; cell-cell signaling; membranous septum morphogenesis; outflow tract morphogenesis; positive regulation of DNA-binding transcription factor activity; Wnt signaling pathway; planar cell polarity pathway involved in neural tube closure; negative regulation of BMP signaling pathway; positive regulation of transcription, DNA-templated; multicellular organism development; cell surface receptor signaling pathway; canonical Wnt signaling pathway involved in mesenchymal stem cell differentiation; canonical Wnt signaling pathway involved in osteoblast differentiation; hard palate development; neuron differentiation; canonical Wnt signaling pathway; negative regulation of transcription, DNA-templated; signal transduction; Wnt signaling pathway involved in midbrain dopaminergic neuron differentiation; beta-catenin destruction complex disassembly; Wnt signaling pathway, planar cell polarity pathway; presynapse assembly; negative regulation of oxidative stress-induced neuron death; non-canonical Wnt signaling pathway; positive regulation of neuron projection development; negative regulation of canonical Wnt signaling pathway; regulation of presynapse assembly
Sources:Amigo / QuickGO
Orthologs
Databases	NCBI: entry; OMA: entry
Species	Human	Mouse
Entrez	8321	14362
Ensembl	ENSG00000157240	ENSMUSG00000044674
UniProt	Q9UP38	O70421
RefSeq (mRNA)	NM_003505	NM_021457
RefSeq (protein)	NP_003496	NP_067432
Location (UCSC)	Chr 7: 91.26 – 91.27 Mb	Chr 5: 4.8 – 4.81 Mb
PubMed search
- Wikidata
View/Edit Human	View/Edit Mouse

Frizzled-1 (Fz-1) is a protein that in humans is encoded by the FZD1 gene.

== Function ==
Members of the 'frizzled' gene family encode 7-transmembrane domain proteins that are receptors for Wnt signaling proteins. The FZD1 protein contains a signal peptide, a cysteine-rich domain in the N-terminal extracellular region, 7 transmembrane domains, and a C-terminal PDZ domain-binding motif. The FZD1 transcript is expressed in various tissues.
