= Frizzled-10 =

Protein-coding gene in humans

FZD10

Identifiers
- Aliases: FZD10, CD350, FZ-10, Fz10, FzE7, hFz10, frizzled class receptor 10
- External IDs: OMIM: 606147; MGI: 2136761; GeneCards: FZD10

Gene location (Human)
Chr.	Chromosome 12 (human)
Band	12q24.33	Start	130,162,459 bp
Band	12q24.33	End	130,165,740 bp

Gene location (Mouse)
Chr.	Chromosome 5 (mouse)
Band	5|5 G1.3	Start	128,677,908 bp
Band	5|5 G1.3	End	128,681,157 bp
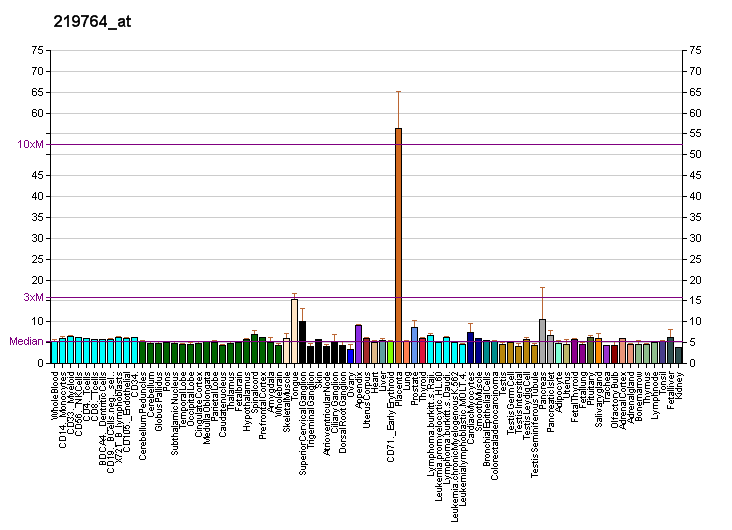
RNA expression pattern
Bgee	Human / Mouse (ortholog); Top expressed in: gingival epithelium; cartilage tissue; epithelium of esophagus; mucosa of pharynx; gonad; synovial joint; human penis; oral cavity; testicle; skin of hip / Top expressed in: hand; tail of embryo; genital tubercle; lip; ventral posteroinferior nucleus; internal capsule; foot; maxillary prominence; hair; urethra; More reference expression data
BioGPS	More reference expression data
Gene ontology
Molecular function	signal transducer activity; protein binding; transmembrane signaling receptor activity; G protein-coupled receptor activity; Wnt-protein binding; Wnt-activated receptor activity
Cellular component	cytoplasm; integral component of membrane; membrane; plasma membrane; integral component of plasma membrane; cell surface; nucleoplasm
Biological process	cellular response to retinoic acid; G protein-coupled receptor signaling pathway; regulation of actin cytoskeleton organization; non-canonical Wnt signaling pathway via JNK cascade; positive regulation of JUN kinase activity; Wnt signaling pathway; multicellular organism development; positive regulation of GTPase activity; cell surface receptor signaling pathway; negative regulation of GTPase activity; neuron differentiation; signal transduction; canonical Wnt signaling pathway; non-canonical Wnt signaling pathway
Sources:Amigo / QuickGO
Orthologs
Databases	NCBI: entry; OMA: entry
Species	Human	Mouse
Entrez	11211	93897
Ensembl	ENSG00000111432	ENSMUSG00000081683
UniProt	Q9ULW2	Q8BKG4
RefSeq (mRNA)	NM_007197	NM_175284
RefSeq (protein)	NP_009128	NP_780493
Location (UCSC)	Chr 12: 130.16 – 130.17 Mb	Chr 5: 128.68 – 128.68 Mb
PubMed search
- Wikidata
View/Edit Human	View/Edit Mouse

Frizzled-10 (Fz-10) is a protein that in humans is encoded by the FZD10 gene. Fz-10 has also been designated as CD350 (cluster of differentiation 350).

== Function ==
This gene is a member of the frizzled gene family. Members of this family encode 7-transmembrane domain proteins that are receptors for the Wingless type MMTV integration site family of signaling proteins. Most frizzled receptors are coupled to the beta-catenin canonical signaling pathway. Using array analysis, expression of this intronless gene is significantly up-regulated in two cases of primary colon cancer.
