= Frizzled =

Family of G-protein coupled receptor proteins

Frizzled/Smoothened family membrane region
- Cartoon structure of the human protein Frizzled5, a member of the Frizzled protein family

Identifiers
- Symbol: Frizzled
- Pfam: PF01534
- Pfam clan: GPCR_A
- InterPro: IPR000539
- PROSITE: PDOC50038
- TCDB: 9.A.14
- OPM superfamily: 6
- OPM protein: 4jkv
- CDD: cd13951
Available protein structures:
- PDB: IPR000539 PF01534 (ECOD; PDBsum)
- AlphaFold: IPR000539; PF01534

Frizzled is a family of atypical G protein-coupled receptors that serve as receptors in the Wnt signaling pathway and other signaling pathways. There are 10 known Frizzled receptor family members in humans. When activated, Frizzled leads to activation of Dishevelled in the cytosol.

== Species distribution ==
Frizzled proteins and the genes that encode them have been identified in an array of animals, from sponges to humans.

== Structure ==
Frizzled family members are transmembrane proteins, which are embedded in the cell membrane. All Frizzled family members have two folded domains: a transmembrane domain, which keeps the protein lodged inside the plasma membrane, and an extracellular domain called the "cysteine-rich domain" or CRD. The two domains are connected by a disordered linker region, which allows the cysteine-rich domain to freely flop around. Intracellularly, Frizzled protein family members have an additional disordered domain of varying length, the tip of which is capable of binding to the PDZ domain of the intracellular protein Dishevelled. The structure of this intracellular domain is not yet fully elucidated.

=== The transmembrane domain ===
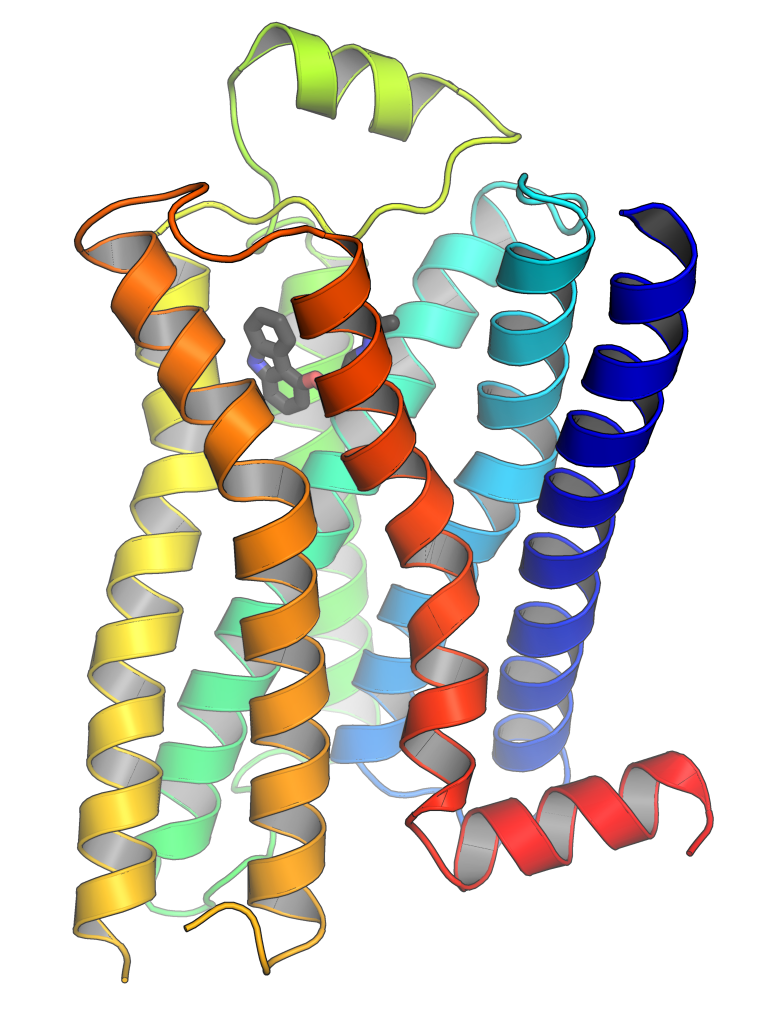
The structure of the transmembrane domain of a different G-protein coupled receptor, beta-2-adrenergic-receptor, shows great similarities with the transmembrane domain of Frizzled receptors.

As an atypical G protein-coupled receptor, Frizzled receptors belong to the seven-(pass)-transmembrane class of receptors (7TMR), due to the transmembrane domain having seven alpha helices that pass through the membrane.

=== The cysteine-rich domain ===
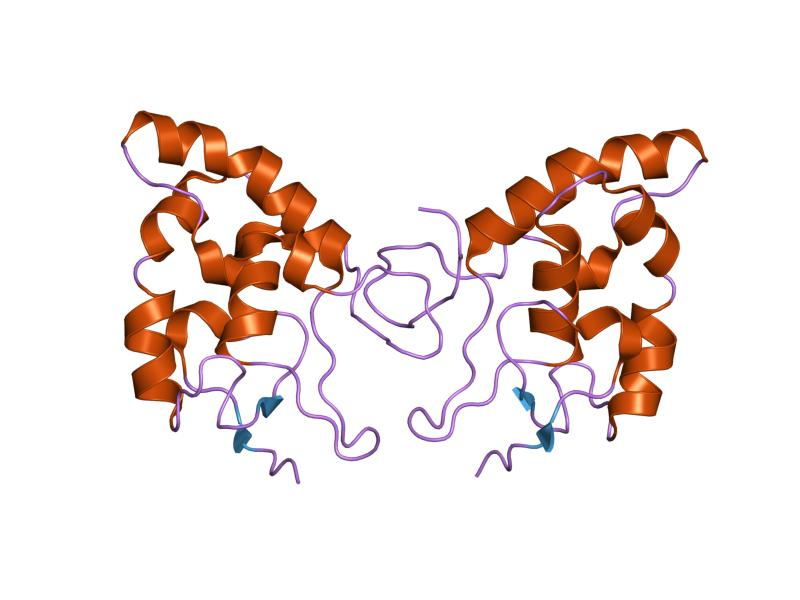
The crystal structure of a dimerized Cysteine-Rich Domain from Mouse Frizzled 8

The cysteine-rich domain of Frizzled receptors is not unique to Frizzled—it is conserved in diverse proteins, including several receptor tyrosine kinases, such as the muscle-specific receptor tyrosine kinase (MuSK), the neuronal-specific kinase (NSK2), and ROR1 and ROR2. The structure of this domain is composed mainly of alpha helices, and contains ten conserved cysteines that form five disulphide bridges.

== Function ==
Frizzled proteins play key roles in governing cell polarity, embryonic development, formation of neural synapses, cell proliferation, and many other processes in developing and adult organisms. These processes occur as a result of one of three known signaling pathways: the canonical Wnt/β-catenin pathway, Wnt/calcium pathway, and planar cell polarity (PCP) pathway. In each of these pathways, Frizzled receptors act as the main binding partner of the extracellular signaling molecule called Wingless-Int (Wnt), though different coreceptors may be required for full activation of the pathway.

Mutations in the human frizzled-4 receptor have been linked to familial exudative vitreoretinopathy, a rare disease affecting the retina at the back of the eye, and the vitreous, the clear fluid inside the eye.

The frizzled (fz) locus of Drosophila coordinates the cytoskeletons of epidermal cells, producing a parallel array of cuticular hairs and bristles. In fz mutants, the orientation of individual hairs with respect both to their neighbours and to the organism as a whole is altered. In the wild-type wing, all hairs point towards the distal tip.

In the developing wing, Fz has 2 functions: it is required for the proximal-distal transmission of an intracellular polarity signal; and it is required for cells to respond to the polarity signal. Fz produces an mRNA that encodes an integral membrane protein with 7 putative transmembrane (TM) domains. This protein should contain both extracellular and cytoplasmic domains, which could function in the transmission and interpretation of polarity information. This signature is usually found downstream of the Fz domain (InterPro: IPR000024)

== Group members ==
There are ten known human frizzled receptors, encoded by separate genes numbered 1 to 10.

Overview of signal transduction pathways involved in apoptosis

- Frizzled-1 (FZD1)
- Frizzled-2 (FZD2)
- Frizzled-3 (FZD3)
- Frizzled-4 (FZD4)
- Frizzled-5 (FZD5)
- Frizzled-6 (FZD6)
- Frizzled-7 (FZD7)
- Frizzled-8 (FZD8)
- Frizzled-9 (FZD9)
- Frizzled-10 (FZD10)

== As a drug target ==
Vantictumab is a monoclonal antibody against five frizzled receptors that is under development for the treatment of cancer.

== See also ==
- Smoothened
