= GARIN5A =

Mammalian protein found in Homo sapiens

Identifiers
- Aliases: GARIN5A, family with sequence similarity 71 member E1, GARIL5, golgi associated RAB2 interactor 5A, FAM71E1
- External IDs: MGI: 1922788; GeneCards: GARIN5A

Gene location (Human)
Chr.	Chromosome 19 (human)
Band	19q13.33	Start	50,466,785 bp
Band	19q13.33	End	50,476,848 bp

Gene location (Mouse)
Chr.	Chromosome 7 (mouse)
Band	7|7 B3	Start	44,146,005 bp
Band	7|7 B3	End	44,150,910 bp
RNA expression pattern
Bgee	Human / Mouse (ortholog); Top expressed in: left testis; right testis; sperm; oocyte; testicle; gonad; secondary oocyte; prefrontal cortex; endothelial cell; hypothalamus / Top expressed in: seminiferous tubule; spermatid; spermatocyte; neural layer of retina; lens; embryo; neural tube; ventricular zone; epithelium of lens; genital tubercle; More reference expression data
BioGPS	n/a
Orthologs
Databases	NCBI: entry; OMA: entry
Species	Human	Mouse
Entrez	112703	75538
Ensembl	ENSG00000142530	ENSMUSG00000051113
UniProt	Q6IPT2	A1L3C1
RefSeq (mRNA)	NM_001308429; NM_138411	NM_028169; NM_001357650; NM_001357651; NM_001368290; NM_001368291 NM_001368292
RefSeq (protein)	NP_001295358; NP_612420	NP_082445; NP_001344579; NP_001344580; NP_001355219; NP_001355220 NP_001355221
Location (UCSC)	Chr 19: 50.47 – 50.48 Mb	Chr 7: 44.15 – 44.15 Mb
PubMed search
- Wikidata
View/Edit Human	View/Edit Mouse

Golgi-associated RAB2 interactor protein 5A is a protein that in humans is encoded by the GARIN5A gene (previously FAM71E1). The GARIN5A protein is predicted to interact with RAB2B and participate in the innate immune system response to DNA viruses.

== Gene ==
=== Location ===
The gene is located on the minus strand at 19q13.33 and spans from 50,466,643 to 50,476,753. It is 10,070 bp long.

=== Gene neighborhood ===
In humans, the gene is flanked by the following genes:

- SPIB: putative oncogene that is active in hematopoietic cells
- MYBPC2: encodes a structural protein and is actively expressed in striated muscle cells
- EMC10: encodes a protein of unknown function
- JOSD2: encodes a protein involved in de-ubiquitination

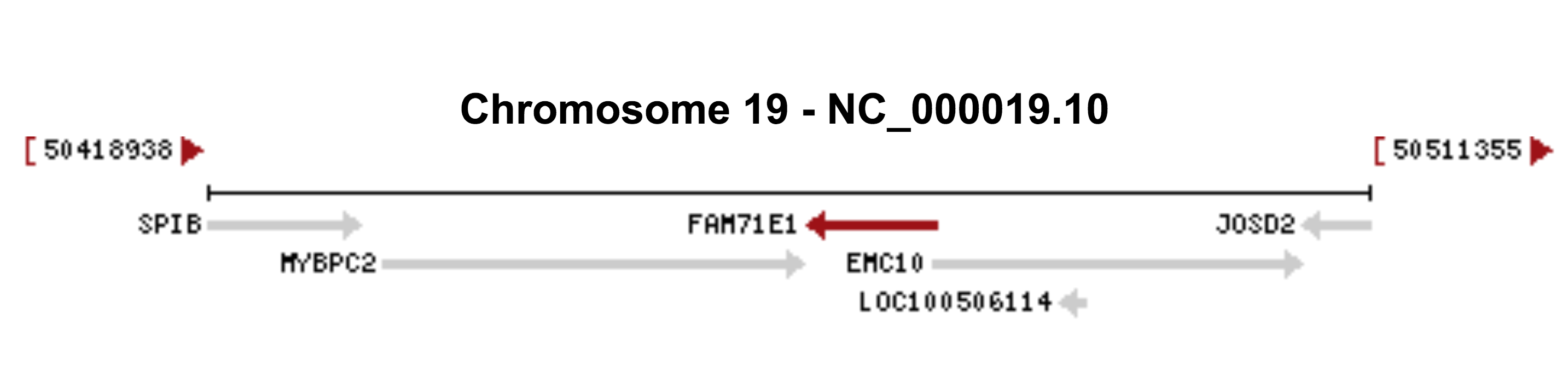
Location of FAM71E1 on minus f Chromstrand oosome 19 at q13.33.

=== Promoter ===
The promoter of FAM71E1 is located on the minus strand from 50,476,094 to 50,477,946 . It is 1,853 bp long.

=== Expression ===
The gene seems to be ubiquitously expressed at low levels throughout the body but has prominent expression in the adult human testis, followed by lower expression levels in the sperm, oocyte, and brain. Age does not have an effect on its expression in the skeletal muscle of males or females. Its expression is elevated prior to the differentiation of embryonic stem cells into pancreatic islet-like cells.

== Transcript ==
=== Isoforms ===
The FAM71E1 gene produces two isoforms from alternative splicing. Isoform 1 is 1281 bp long, and isoform 2 is slightly shorter at 1233 bp long. Both transcript variants have 5 exons, 4 of which are coding exons. The third intron for the isoform 2 transcript is longer than the one found in isoform 1.

=== Regulation ===
The FAM71E1 transcript is regulated by micro-RNAs, such as miR-149, miR-7, miR-125b, miR-125a-5p, miR192-5p, and miR-215.

== Protein ==
=== Properties ===
The protein from isoform 1 is 247 amino acids long with a molecular weight of 27.6 kDa. It has a charge of 5.0 and an isoelectric point of 8.9. It has a domain of unknown function (DUF3699), which is conserved in eukaryotes and has no known pairwise interactions with other domains. The structure of the protein has 3 alpha helices and 5 beta strands.

=== Localization ===
The protein is predicted to localize to the nucleus and thought to be mainly associated with the nucleoli fibrillar center. It can also be exported to the cytoplasm.

== Homologs ==
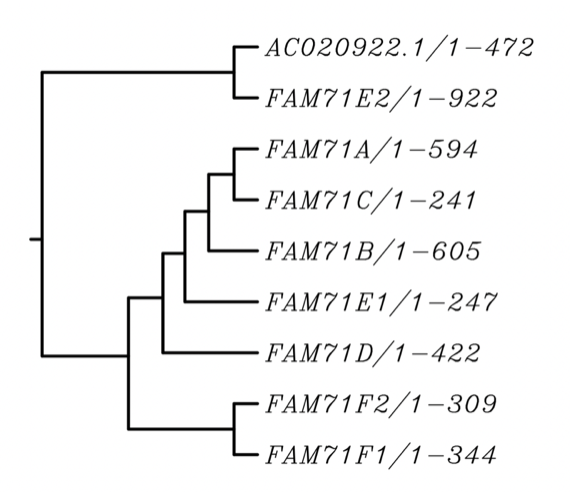
Evolutionary tree of FAM71E1 paralogs and their associated peptide length

=== Paralogs ===
The FAM71E1 gene is fast evolving. It has the following 8 paralogs: FAM71A, FAM71B, FAM71C, FAM71D, FAM71E2, FAM71F1, FAM71F2, and AC020922.1. FAM71D, FAM71E2 and AC0209221.1 are found in Amniotes and their last common ancestor with FAM71E1 was likely in the ancestor of the Sauria taxon, which includes reptiles and birds. The remaining paralogs are found in mammals and are expressed in organisms from the evolutionary descendants of the lobe-finned fish (Sarcopterygii). Their last common ancestor with FAM71E1 was Coelacanth (Latimeria chalumnae).

Overview of FAM71E1 Paralogs
Paralog	Accession number	Sequence length (aa)	Sequence Identity (%)	Sequence Similarity (%)
FAM71E1	NM_001308429	247	100	100
FAM71C	NP_699195.1	241	20.1	28.0
FAM71F1	NP_115988.1	344	16.3	24.2
FAM71F2	NP_001012457.3	309	15.4	23.8
FAM71D	NP_775797.2	422	12.0	16.5
AC020922.1	Unavailable	472	11.1	16.3
FAM71A	NP_705834.2	594	10.8	14.5
FAM71B	NP_570969.2	605	10.2	13.9
FAM71E2	NP_001138874.1	922	6.8	9.0

=== Orthologs ===
Orthologs of FAM71E1 can be found only in vertebrates, primarily in placental mammals in the Boreoeutheria group and occasionally in a few reptilian species. Reptiles and marsupials are included in the distant homologs, while orthologs in placental animals such as rodents and primates are more closely related to FAM71E1. The gene history contains 27 duplication events and 1 splitting event.

Overview of FAM71E1 Orthologs
Genus and species	Common Name	Accession number	Length (aa)	Identity (%)	Similarity (%)
Homo sapiens	Human	NP_001295358	247	100	100
Pan troglodytes	Chimpanzee	XP_009434364	247	98	97
Microcebus murinus	Gray mouse lemur	XP_012609669.1	233	79	82
Mus musculus	House mouse	NP_082445.1	212	68	72
Equus caballus	Horse	XP_023505998.1	192	76	79
Bos taurus	Cattle	XP_010813399	227	75	79
Panthera pardus	Leopard	XP_019281103	217	71	76
Trichechus manatus latirostris	Florida manatee	XP_004381904	219	73	76
Phascolarctos cinereus	Koala	XP_020827525	231	68	75
Python bivittatus	Burmese python	XP_007423163	167	50	64
Anolis carolinensis	Green anole	XP_016850131	131	37	48

== Clinical significance ==
=== Mutations ===
There are no disease-causing mutations associated with this gene, and it is tolerant towards loss-of-function variants.

=== Disease associations ===
FAM71E1 has reduced expression in Type 2 diabetes patients and is likely not involved in the disease's pathophysiology. Its expression is also altered in Parkinson's disease and several cancers, such as non-triple negative ductal carcinoma in situ, breast cancer, pancreatic adenocarcinoma, and colorectal carcinoma. It is a gene of interest in predicting susceptibility to pneumonia.
