= GARIN2 =

Protein-coding gene in the species Homo sapiens

Identifiers
- Aliases: GARIN2, C14orf54, family with sequence similarity 71 member D, golgi associated RAB2 interactor family member 2, GARI-L1, FAM71D, GARI-L2
- External IDs: MGI: 1918147; GeneCards: GARIN2

Gene location (Human)
| Chr. | Chromosome 14 (human) |
| Band | 14q23.3 | Start | 67,189,393 bp |
| Band | 14q23.3 | End | 67,228,550 bp |

Gene location (Mouse)
| Chr. | Chromosome 12 (mouse) |
| Band | 12|12 C3 | Start | 78,691,535 bp |
| Band | 12|12 C3 | End | 78,734,516 bp |
RNA expression pattern
| Bgee | Human / Mouse (ortholog); Top expressed in: left testis; right testis; testicle; sperm; gonad; buccal mucosa cell; apex of heart; right lobe of liver; Achilles tendon; right lobe of thyroid gland / Top expressed in: spermatid; seminiferous tubule; spermatocyte; zygote; embryo; embryo; secondary oocyte; neural layer of retina; tail of embryo; right kidney; More reference expression data |
| BioGPS | n/a |
Orthologs
| Databases | NCBI: entry; OMA: entry |
| Species | Human | Mouse |
| Entrez | 161142 | 70897 |
| Ensembl | ENSG00000172717 | ENSMUSG00000056987 |
| UniProt | Q8N9W8 | D3YV92 |
| RefSeq (mRNA) | NM_173526; NM_001395907 | NM_027597; NM_029069 |
| RefSeq (protein) | NP_775797 | NP_001390878; NP_001390880; NP_001390886; NP_001390887; NP_001390888 NP_001390889; NP_001390890; NP_001390891; NP_001390892; NP_081873; NP_083345 |
| Location (UCSC) | Chr 14: 67.19 – 67.23 Mb | Chr 12: 78.69 – 78.73 Mb |
| PubMed search |
- Wikidata
| View/Edit Human | View/Edit Mouse |

Golgi-associated RAB2 interactor protein 2 is a protein that in humans is encoded by the GARIN2 gene (previously FAM71D). The GARIN2 protein seems to be involved in sperm movement. GARIN2 has 7 known paralogs: GARIN1A, GARIN1B, GARIN3, GARIN4, GARIN5A, GARIN5B, and GARIN6.

== Gene ==
In humans, FAM71D is located at 14q23.3 and stretches between positions 67189393 and 67228550 (span 39157 bp). It codes for at least 10 unique human protein isoforms: the primary isoform (422 aa; also denoted X1), isoform X2 (417 aa), isoform X3 (413 aa), isoform X4 (400 aa), isoform X5 (399 aa), isoform X6 (398 aa), isoform X7 (392 aa), isoform X8 (389 aa), isoform X9 (347 aa), isoform X10 (336 aa) In humans, FAM71D codes for an mRNA strand that is 1790 base pairs long. The human mRNA is composed of a 5' untranslated region that is 290 bases long and a 3' untranslated region that is 231 bases long The gene has the following neighbours on the same chromosome:

MPP5: MAGUK p55 subfamily member 5 plays a role in tumour suppression and receptor clustering
GPHN: Gephyrin plays a role in anchoring inhibitory neurotransmitter receptors to postsynaptic cytoskeleton
AT6V1D: V-type proton ATPase subunit D, an enzyme that mediates acidifcation of eukaryotic intracellular organelles
SF3B44P1: Splicing Factor 3b, Subunit 4 Pseudogene 1
LOC101927920: Probable Ribosome Biogenesis Protein RLP24-Like
LOC105370538: Uncharacterized protein
LOC105370541: Uncharacterized protein

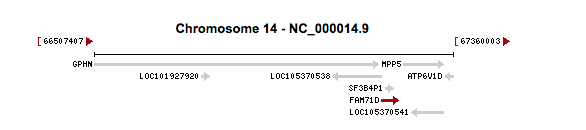

== Homology ==
| Genus and Species | Common name | Accession number | Seq. length | Seq. identity | Seq. similarity |
| Pan troglodytes | Chimpanzee | XP_0011335797.2 | 422 a | 97% | 98% |
| Chlorocebus Sabaeus | Green Monkey | XP_007985246.1 | 422 a | 94% | 97% |
| Macaca mulatta | Rhesus macaque | XP_001102828.2 | 422 a | 94% | 96% |
| Camelus dromedarius | Dromedary | XP_5010975019.1 | 476 a | 70% | 81% |
| Vicogna pacos | Alpaca | XP_006207055.1 | 573 a | 70% | 80% |
| Bos taurus | Cattle | XP_010807832.1 | 400 a | 68% | 79% |
| Odobenus rosmarus divergens | Walrus | XP_004397632.1 | 412 a | 70% | 81% |
| Pteropus vampyrus | Large flying fox | XP_011384479.1 | 527 a | 73% | 80% |
| Felis catus | Cat | XP_011281587.1 | 398 a | 74% | 82% |
| Mus musculus | Mouse | NP_083345.1 | 440 a | 59% | 74% |
| Oryctolagus cuniculus | European rabbit | XP_008270069.1 | 397 a | 75% | 84% |
| Capra hircus | Goat | XP_005686047.1 | 397 a | 72% | 82% |
| Pantholops hodgsonii | Tibetan antelope | XP_005961615.1 | 397 a | 71% | 82% |
| Ornicus orca | Killer whale | XP_004262188.1 | 391 a | 72% | 81% |
| Tursiops trucatus | Bottlenose dolphin | XP_004322689.1 | 391 a | 72% | 81% |
| Phseter catodon | Sperm whale | XP_007119740.1 | 397 a | 72% | 82% |
| Equus caballus | Horse | XP_005605311.1 | 386 a | 69% | 79% |
| Ailuropoda melanoleuca | Giant panda | XP_0112304461.1 | 417 a | 71% | 81% |
| Fukomys demarensis | Dimaraland mole-rat | XP_010643626.1 | 412 a | 74% | 83% |

== Protein ==
The primary protein encoded by FAM71D in humans is 422 amino acids long with a molecular weight of 47076 Da. The protein is part of a functionally uncharacterized family of proteins (pfam 12480) with a domain of unknown function DUF3699.

=== Structure ===
Several tools are available to predict the secondary structure of a protein. One tool that combines the results of few of them is PELE on SDSC Biology WorkBench. According to this tool, the protein's secondary structure is mostly alpha helices, beta stands and coiled-coiled domains.

=== Post translational modifications ===
Like any other protein, this protein undergoes post-translational modifications. FAM71D is predicted to contain 2 nuclear export signals, and lacks both a signal peptide and transmembrane domains.

=== Interactions ===
FAM71D interacts with PGK2, TUBA3C, and HSPB1. FAM71D is also predicted to interact with the following proteins using STRING:

THUMPD3: THUMP domain containing 3
CCDC170: Coiled-coil domain containing 170
KLH10: Kelch-like 10
TMEM48: Transmembrane protein 48
SHCBP1L: SHC SH2-domain binding protein
ASNA1: arsA arsenite transporter
PPP1R16A: Protein Phosphate 1, regulatory subunit 16A
IZUMO1: izumo sperm-egg fusion 1
SF3B2: Splicing factor 3b, submit 2
TUBB4B: Tubulin, beta 4B class IVb

== Expression ==
FAM71D is primarily expressed in the testis of humans only expressed during the adult developmental stage. GEO microarray data also supports the expression of FAM71D in humans

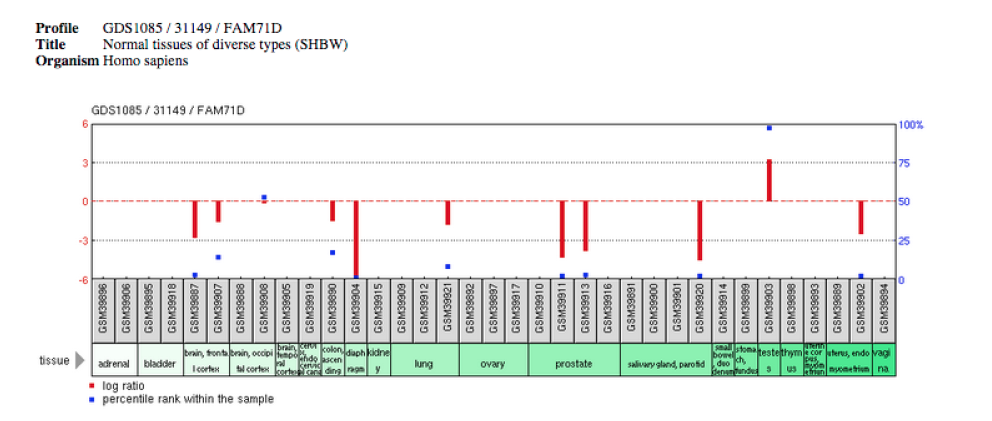

== Clinical relevance ==
No studies have directly associated FAM71D protein with certain diseases. However, using NCBI GEO Profiles, FAM71D was found to be over-expressed in patients with unruptured intracranial aneurysms.
