= GARIN1A =

Protein-coding gene in the species Homo sapiens

Identifiers
- Aliases: GARIN1A, FAM137B, family with sequence similarity 71 member F2, GARI, FAM71F2, golgi associated RAB2 interactor 1A
- External IDs: MGI: 2141439; GeneCards: GARIN1A

Gene location (Human)
Chr.	Chromosome 7 (human)
Band	7q32.1	Start	128,671,693 bp
Band	7q32.1	End	128,687,877 bp

Gene location (Mouse)
Chr.	Chromosome 6 (mouse)
Band	6|6 A3.3	Start	29,279,592 bp
Band	6|6 A3.3	End	29,290,679 bp
RNA expression pattern
Bgee	Human / Mouse (ortholog); Top expressed in: sperm; right testis; left testis; buccal mucosa cell; testicle; apex of heart; right adrenal cortex; muscle of thigh; anterior pituitary; left ventricle / Top expressed in: spermatid; testicle; spermatocyte; embryo; embryo; islet of Langerhans; white adipose tissue; lung; neural layer of retina; urinary bladder; More reference expression data
BioGPS	n/a
Orthologs
Databases	NCBI: entry; OMA: entry
Species	Human	Mouse
Entrez	346653	245884
Ensembl	ENSG00000205085	ENSMUSG00000079652
UniProt	Q6NXP2	B2RXB0
RefSeq (mRNA)	NM_001012454; NM_001128926; NM_001290254; NM_001290255	NM_001101486
RefSeq (protein)	NP_001012457; NP_001122398; NP_001277183; NP_001277184	NP_001094956
Location (UCSC)	Chr 7: 128.67 – 128.69 Mb	Chr 6: 29.28 – 29.29 Mb
PubMed search
- Wikidata
View/Edit Human	View/Edit Mouse

Golgi-associated RAB2 interactor protein 1A, also known as FAM71F2, is a protein that in humans is encoded by the GARIN1A gene. This gene is highly active in the reproductive tissues, specifically the testis, and may serve as a potential biomarker for determining metastatic testicular cancer.

== Gene ==
=== Location ===
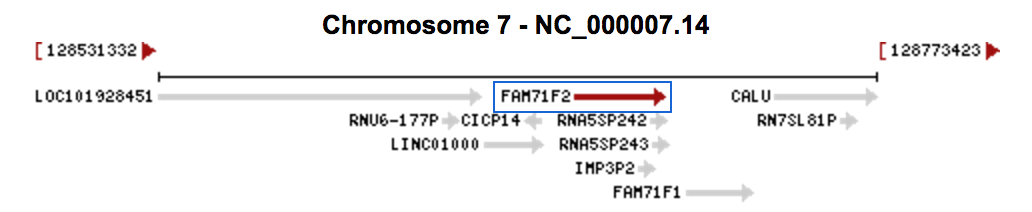
Figure 1. Location of the gene FAM71F2, marked with a blue rectangle, on Chromosome 7. Neighboring genes in the area are labelled as well.

FAM71F2 gene is located on chromosome 7 in humans (7q32.1), starting at 128,671,636 and ending at 128,702,262 on the positive strand. The gene paralog FAM71F1 and the gene LINC01000 directly neighbor FAM71F2 on chromosome 7.

=== Size of gene ===
The gene spans 30,627 base pairs and codes for 12 exons.

=== Common aliases ===
FAM71F2 is also referred to as family with sequence similarity 137 member B, FAM137B.

== mRNA ==
FAM71F2 has 14 transcript variants. Isoform a is the longest of the mRNA transcripts and spans 5,775 base pairs that translates into a 309 amino acids sequence. It codes for 5 exons. Other alternative splice isoforms are labelled in the diagram in Figure 2.

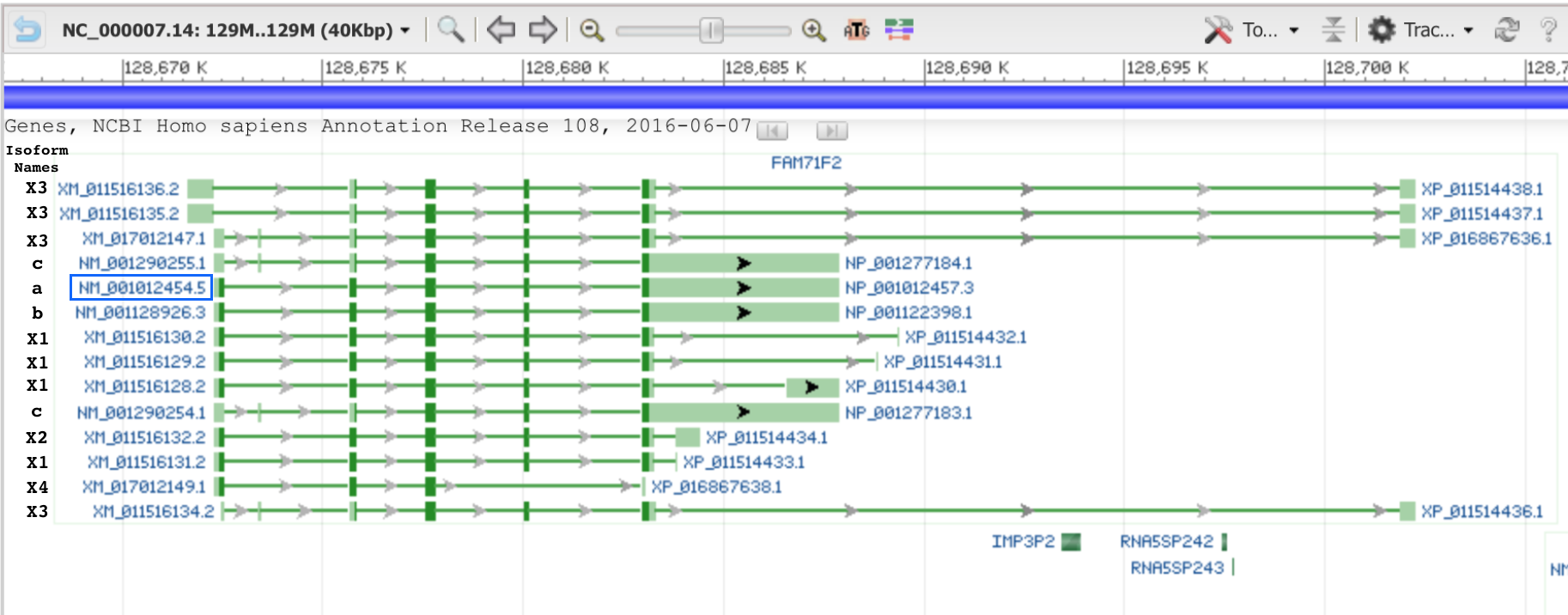
Figure 2. Diagram of the 14 annotated transcript variants for FAM71F2 with the protein isoform names on the left.

At the first splice site, Isoform b, found in most reptiles having FAM71F2 protein, deletes the following nine amino acids and picks up at the valine amino acid at location 61 in humans. Isoform c uses an alternative downstream start site to Isoform a and adds another exon between the first and second exons of Isoform a.

=== General properties ===
The molecular weight of FAM71F2 is 34.5 kilodaltons. The isoelectric point is 6.15.

=== Domains and motifs ===
FAM71F2 protein contains only one domain, named domain of unknown function, DUF3699. This domain is located from amino acids 114-185 on the human FAM71F2 protein. This domain family is found only in eukaryotes and approximately 71 amino acids in length. There is also a potential R-2 mitochondrial pre-sequence cleavage site that would signal the protein to the mitochondria. These sites are labelled in Figure 4 below.

=== Secondary structure ===
The secondary structure of FAM71F2 contains alpha helices and beta sheets. These structures are identified in the generated image of the FAM71F2 protein in Figure 3. Highly conserved amino acid residues, such as the Val61-Thr62-Lys63 sequence where the reptiles and isoform b pick up in the second exon, are labelled on this figure as well.

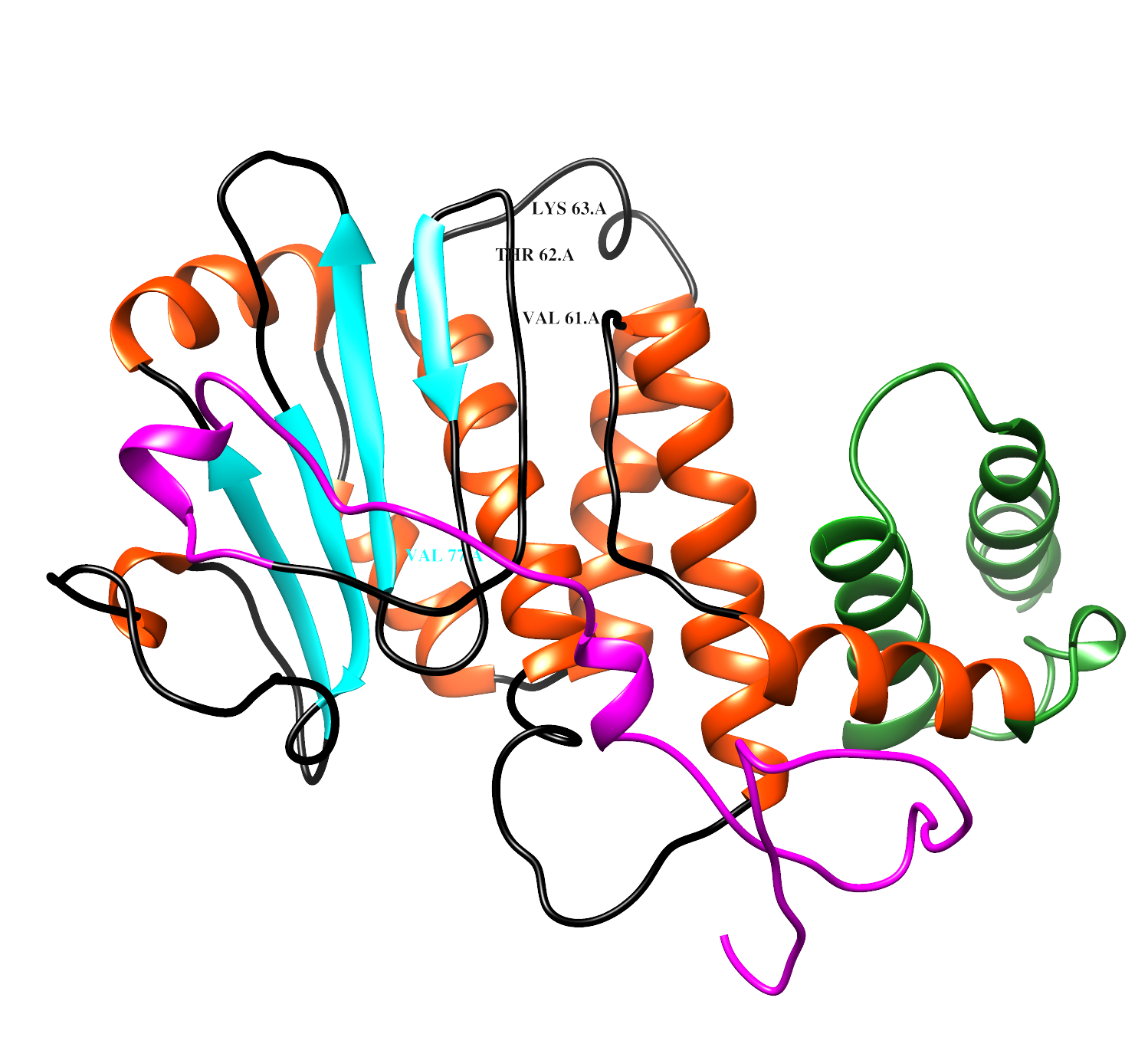
Figure 3. Diagram of the FAM71F2 protein with secondary structures and highly conserved amino acid residues. Alpha helices are labelled in orange, beta sheets in cyan, the N-terminus is magenta, and the C-terminus is green.

=== Post-translational modifications ===
FAM71F2 has seven highly conserved phosphorylated sites. There is one acetylation site and one N-glycosylation site, playing a role in stabilizing the protein.

Figure 4. Schematic diagram of FAM71F2 protein. The DUF3699 domain is labelled as the large, grey hexagonal shape. A potential R-2 mitochondrial targeting sequence shown at 5' end is labelled with a red rectangle. Conserved phosphorylation sites are labelled with the red stop sign images and a 5' acetylation site on the second amino acid is labelled with a grey stop sign image. A N-terminus glycosylation site on Met98 is shown as a thin, green rectangle and two cysteine bonds are labelled with the green brackets.

=== Sub-cellular localization ===
FAM71F2 protein stays in the cytoplasm of cells, but may have localization in the nucleus and mitochondria.

== Expression ==
=== Tissue expression pattern ===
FAM71F2 is highly expressed in reproductive structures, such as the testis, epididymis, uterus and ovaries. There is some expression in the brain and connective tissue as well. As development stages progress, the number of gene transcripts increases and are at highest expression levels in adults. In the mouse, during spermatogenesis and development of the testis, gene transcript levels of FAM71F2 increase dramatically.

=== Cellular expression ===
FAM71F2 protein expression has been detected in the cytoplasm of Leydig cells and in epididymis cells of the male testis and is also detected in the cytoplasm in ovarian follicles.

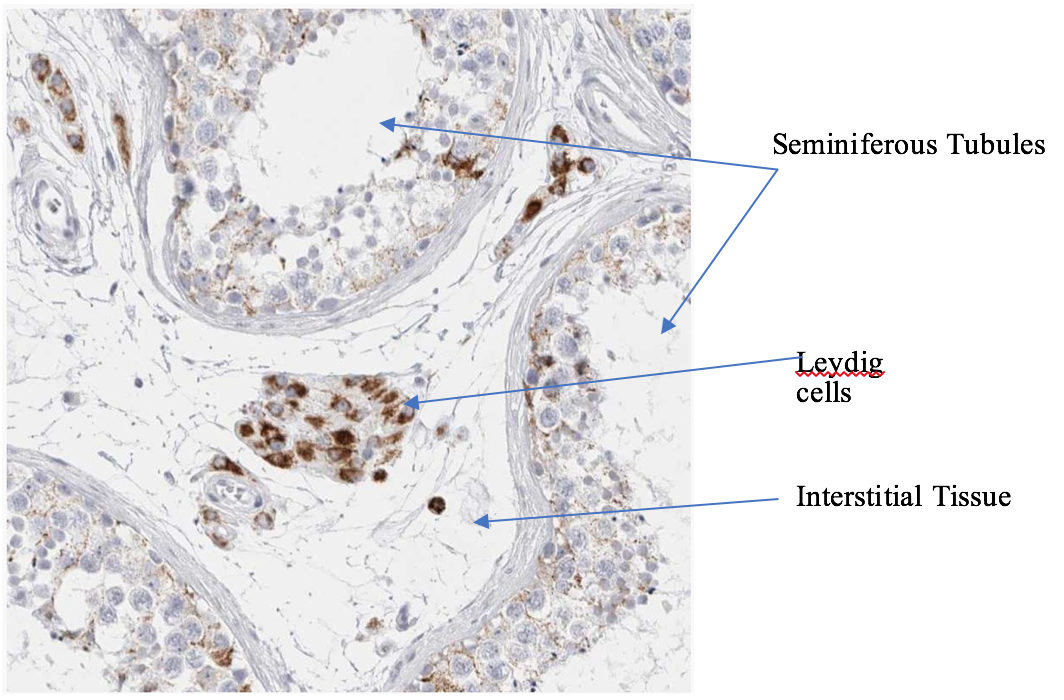
Figure 4. Immunohistological staining of FAM71F2 in the human testis.

=== Expression level ===
FAM71F2 is moderately expressed in comparison to other proteins in the human, with an average protein expression level of 8.47 part per million.

== Clinical significance ==
FAM71F2 is repressed in males with non-obstructive azoospermia and teratozoospermia, or abnormalities in sperm morphology and quantity. These diseases lead to fertility issues. In addition, FAM71F2 gene expression is up-regulated with Dopamine receptor D1 expression in testicular cancer patients, and may be an important biomarker for metastatic forms of this cancer.

== Homology ==
FAM71F2 has 91 orthologs in other animal species. Its evolutionary history goes as far back as the reptiles, and its most distant relative is the homolog in the west Indian Ocean coelacanth. The time of divergence between eight orthologs from the human FAM71F2 is shown in Figure 5. It is not found in birds or in Gallus gallus (chicken). FAM71F2 has six paralogs in humans: FAM71A, FAM71B, FAM71C, FAM71D, FAM71E1, and FAM71F1.

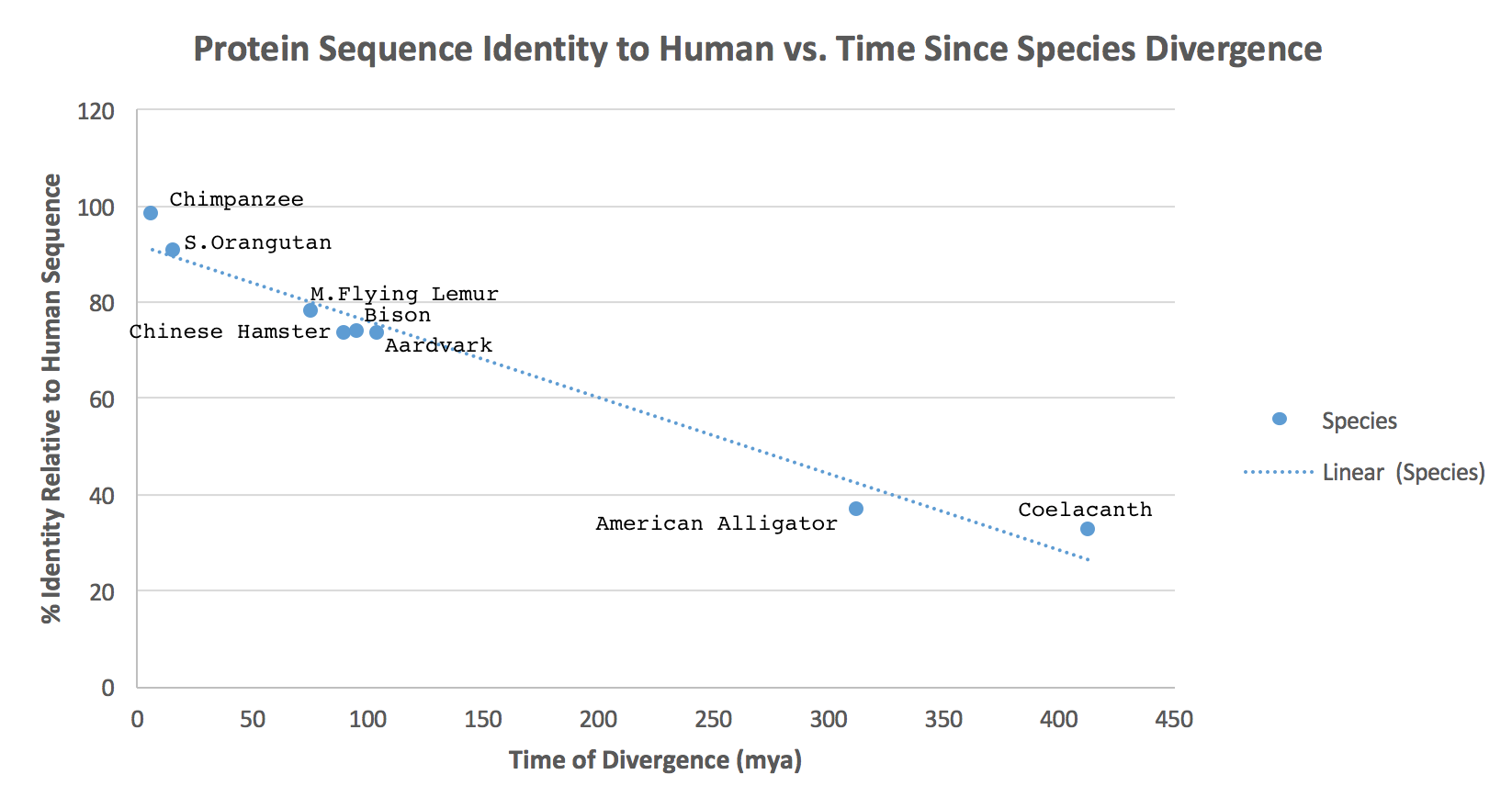
Figure 5. Date of Divergence of FAM71F2 from the human ortholog.
