= GET3 =

Protein-coding gene in the species Homo sapiens

Identifiers
- Aliases: GET3, ARSA-I, ARSA1, ASNA-I, TRC40, hASNA-I, arsA arsenite transporter, ATP-binding, homolog 1 (bacterial), ASNA1, Guided Entry Of Tail-Anchored Proteins Factor 3, ATPase
- External IDs: OMIM: 601913; MGI: 1928379; GeneCards: GET3

Gene location (Human)
Chr.	Chromosome 19 (human)
Band	19p13.13	Start	12,737,139 bp
Band	19p13.13	End	12,748,323 bp

Gene location (Mouse)
Chr.	Chromosome 8 (mouse)
Band	8|8 C3	Start	85,744,560 bp
Band	8|8 C3	End	85,751,910 bp
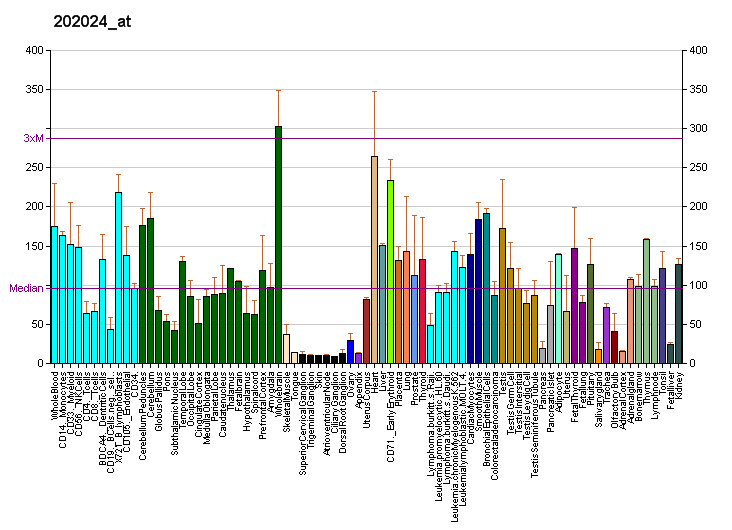
RNA expression pattern
Bgee	Human / Mouse (ortholog); Top expressed in: monocyte; stromal cell of endometrium; prefrontal cortex; right adrenal gland; apex of heart; right adrenal cortex; right frontal lobe; left adrenal gland; right testis; islet of Langerhans / Top expressed in: choroid plexus of fourth ventricle; yolk sac; epiblast; dentate gyrus of hippocampal formation granule cell; neural layer of retina; superior frontal gyrus; primary visual cortex; central gray substance of midbrain; perirhinal cortex; medulla oblongata; More reference expression data
BioGPS	More reference expression data
Gene ontology
Molecular function	nucleotide binding; ATPase activity; protein binding; hydrolase activity; ATP binding; arsenite transmembrane transporter activity; metal ion binding; transporter activity; ATPase-coupled transmembrane transporter activity
Cellular component	cytoplasm; nucleolus; extracellular exosome; endoplasmic reticulum membrane; nucleus; endoplasmic reticulum; GET complex
Biological process	IRE1-mediated unfolded protein response; inorganic anion transport; transport; posttranslational protein targeting to endoplasmic reticulum membrane; arsenite transport; protein insertion into ER membrane; tail-anchored membrane protein insertion into ER membrane
Sources:Amigo / QuickGO
Orthologs
Databases	NCBI: entry; OMA: entry
Species	Human	Mouse
Entrez	439	56495
Ensembl	ENSG00000198356	ENSMUSG00000052456
UniProt	O43681	O54984
RefSeq (mRNA)	NM_004317	NM_019652; NM_001357202; NM_001357203
RefSeq (protein)	NP_004308; NP_001358417; NP_001358418	NP_062626; NP_001344131; NP_001344132
Location (UCSC)	Chr 19: 12.74 – 12.75 Mb	Chr 8: 85.74 – 85.75 Mb
PubMed search
- Wikidata
View/Edit Human	View/Edit Mouse

ATPase GET3 (also known as ATPase ASNA1, arsenical pump-driving ATPase and arsenite-stimulated ATPase) is an enzyme that in humans is encoded by the gene GET3 (previously ASNA1).

== Function ==
GET3 is the human homolog of the bacterial arsA gene. In E. coli, arsA ATPase is the catalytic component of a multisubunit oxyanion pump that is responsible for resistance to arsenicals and antimonials.

== Interactions ==
The protein GET3 is found to interact with FAM71D according to STRING
