= GARIN5B =

Identifiers
- Aliases: GARIN5B, C19orf16, family with sequence similarity 71 member E2, FAM71E2, golgi associated RAB2 interactor family member 5B
- External IDs: MGI: 3045311; GeneCards: GARIN5B

Gene location (Human)
Chr.	Chromosome 19 (human)
Band	19q13.42	Start	55,354,908 bp
Band	19q13.42	End	55,363,260 bp

Gene location (Mouse)
Chr.	Chromosome 7 (mouse)
Band	7|7 A1	Start	4,756,225 bp
Band	7|7 A1	End	4,774,301 bp
RNA expression pattern
Bgee	Human / Mouse (ortholog); Top expressed in: right testis; left testis; olfactory zone of nasal mucosa; left uterine tube; hypothalamus; human musculoskeletal system; skeletal muscle; muscle of leg; gastrocnemius muscle; prostate / Top expressed in: testicle; spermatid; spermatocyte; islet of Langerhans; More reference expression data
BioGPS	n/a
Orthologs
Databases	NCBI: entry; OMA: entry
Species	Human	Mouse
Entrez	284418	243822
Ensembl	ENSG00000180043	ENSMUSG00000092518
UniProt	Q8N5Q1	n/a
RefSeq (mRNA)	NM_001145402	NM_172895
RefSeq (protein)	NP_001138874	n/a
Location (UCSC)	Chr 19: 55.35 – 55.36 Mb	Chr 7: 4.76 – 4.77 Mb
PubMed search
- Wikidata
View/Edit Human	View/Edit Mouse

Golgi-Associated RAB2 Interactor Protein 5B is a protein that in humans is encoded by the GARIN5B gene, previously FAM71E2. Not too much has been reported about the function of this protein, but it is predicted to be located in the sperm head and be involved in sperm movement.

== Gene ==
=== Location ===
FAM71E2 is located on the minus strand at 9q13.42 and extends from 55,354,908 bp to 55,363,252 bp. The gene is 8,353 bp long, and has 11 exons.

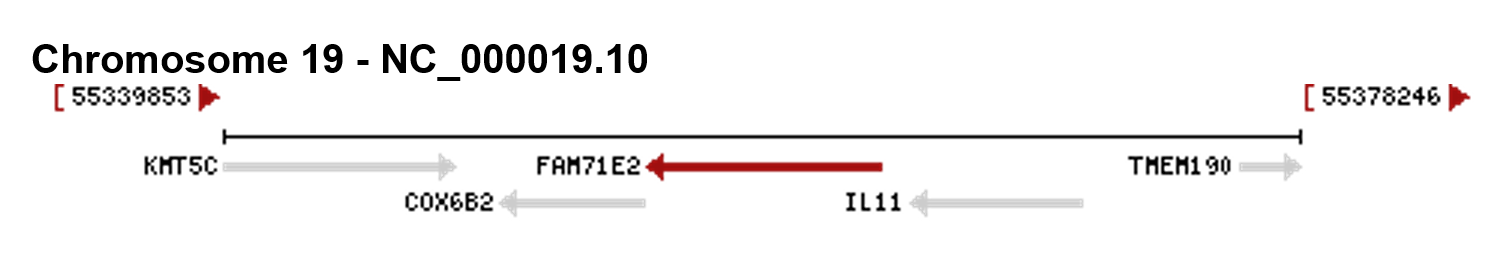
FAM71E2 gene

=== Gene Neighborhood ===
These genes are closest to FAM71E2 on the human genome:

- TMEM190: protein with unknown function.
- COX6B2: protein that connects the two COX monomers into the physiological dimeric form.
- KMT5B: protein with unknown function.
- IL11: cytokine with multiple functions.

== Transcript ==
=== mRNA variants ===
Two alternatively spliced mRNA variants are produced during transcription: aAUG10 and bAUG10. They are both validated alternative polyadenylation sites. However, there are no isoforms of FAM71E2.

=== Stem loops ===
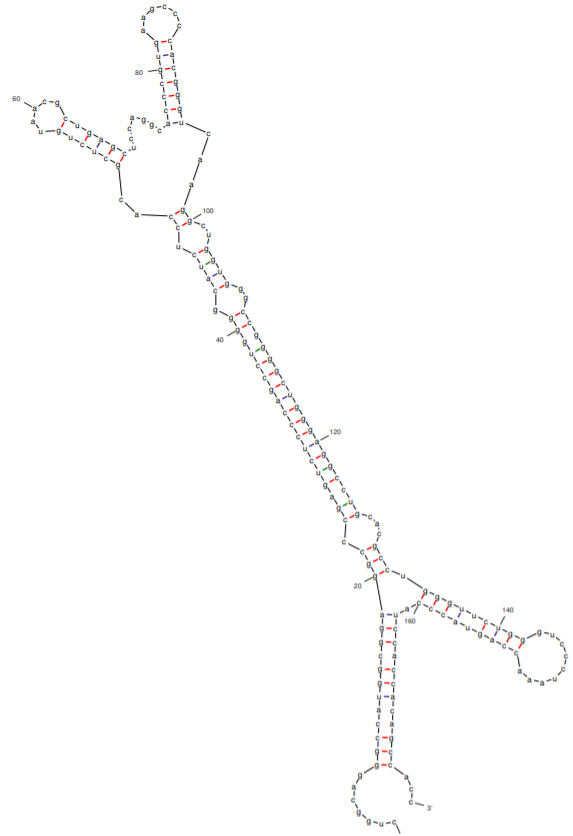
5' UTR folding FAM71E2

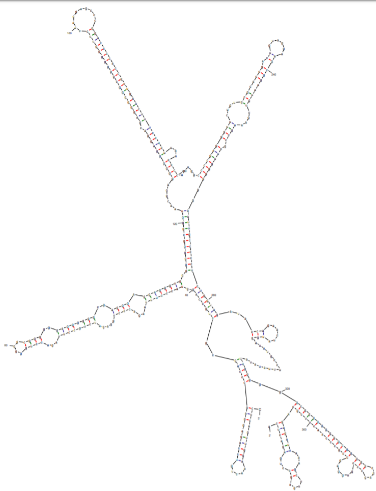
3' UTR folding FAM71E2

Conserved stem loop regions were found on both the 5' and 3' UTR in closely related orthologs. There were no conserved stem loops for distantly related orthologs.

== Protein ==
=== Properties ===
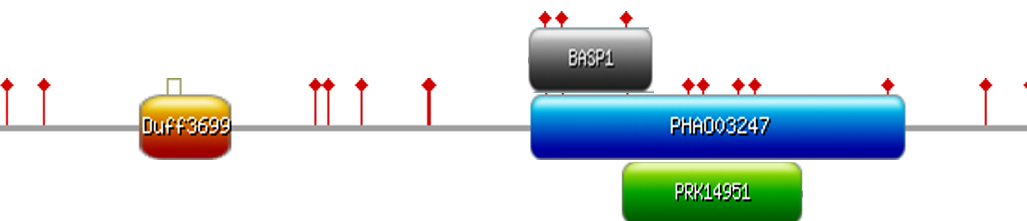
Visualization of domains and motifs on the FAM71E2 gene

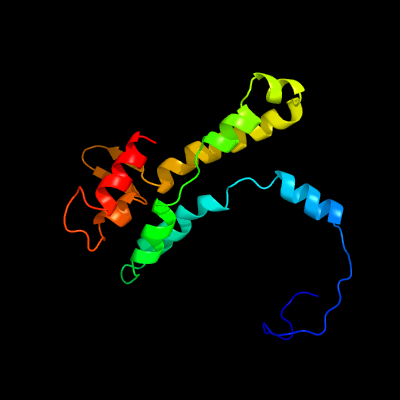
Secondary structure of FAM71E2

FAM71E2 is 922 amino acids long and has a molecular weight of 10/100,000 pI/Mw. The protein has four different domains: DUF3699, PRK14951, PHA03247, and BASP1. The structure consists of 8 alpha helixes and 1 beta sheet.

=== Localization ===
This protein is localized in the nucleus. Localization in the nucleus is conserved in all orthologs.

== Gene regulation ==
=== Promoter ===
The promoter of FAM71E2 is located between 55363152 and 55364260 on the minus strand and is 1,109 bp long. This promoter was selected based on its main expression in the testes and high CAGE values.

=== Transcription factor binding sites ===
Multiple transcription factor binding sites were found for FAM71E2. They were selected based on relatedness to potential gene function such as SOX11 and estrogen response elements.

=== Expression ===
FAM71E2 is primarily expressed in male tissues, particularly the testis. There is also lower expression in the brain, mammary gland, prostate, and thymus. FAM71E2 has also been expressed in breast (mammary gland) tumor and normal tissues.

==== Metaphase II stage oocytes matured in vivo ====
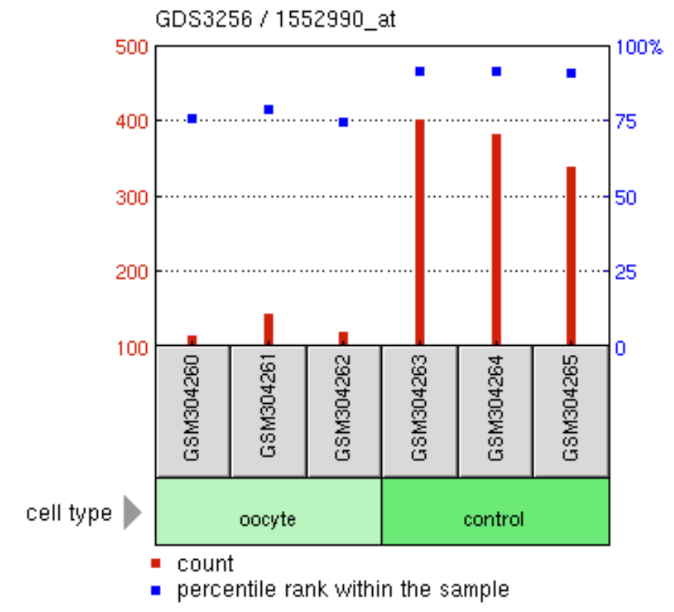
Metaphase II stage oocytes matured in vivo

The graph on the right is from a study analyzing the Metaphase II stage oocytes matured in vivo. The goal of this study was to identify genes and deduced pathways from human oocyte that can help us understand oogenesis, folliculogenesis, fertilization, and embryonic development. The control consisted of RNA from 10 different normal human tissues: skeletal muscle, kidney, lung, colon, liver, spleen, breast, brain, heart, and stomach. The results from this study indicate that expression of FAM71E2 in oocytes is very low compared to that of normal adult tissue from various parts of the body. Human protein atlas supports these observations since there was no expression during the earliest phase of development (embryoid body). However, Human protein atlas also showed there was very minimal expression in the fetus.

==== Estrogen receptor alpha-silenced MCF7 breast cancer cells ====
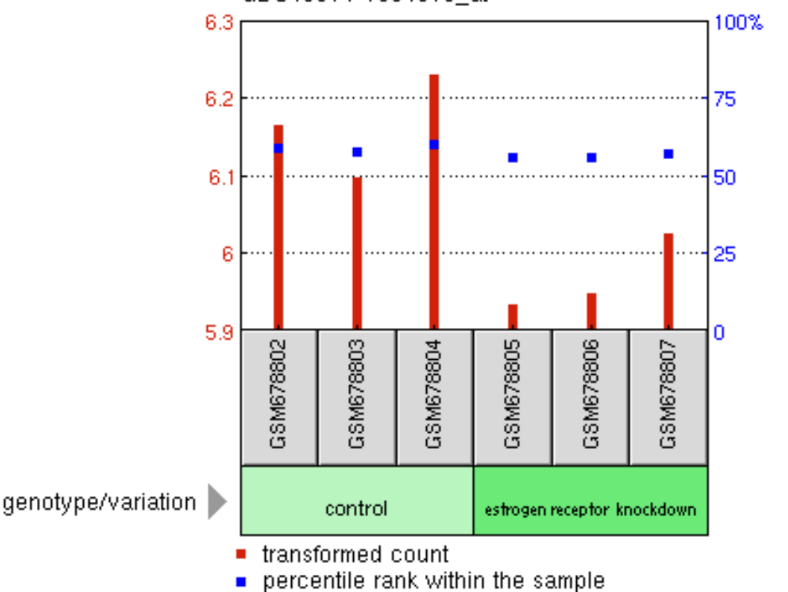
Estrogen receptor alpha-silenced MCF7 breast cancer cells.

This study indicates that there is a very slight decrease in FAM71E2 expression in estrogen receptor knockdown samples. This study may also support the Human protein atlas information stating FAM71E2 has slight expression in Breast (mammary glad) tumors.

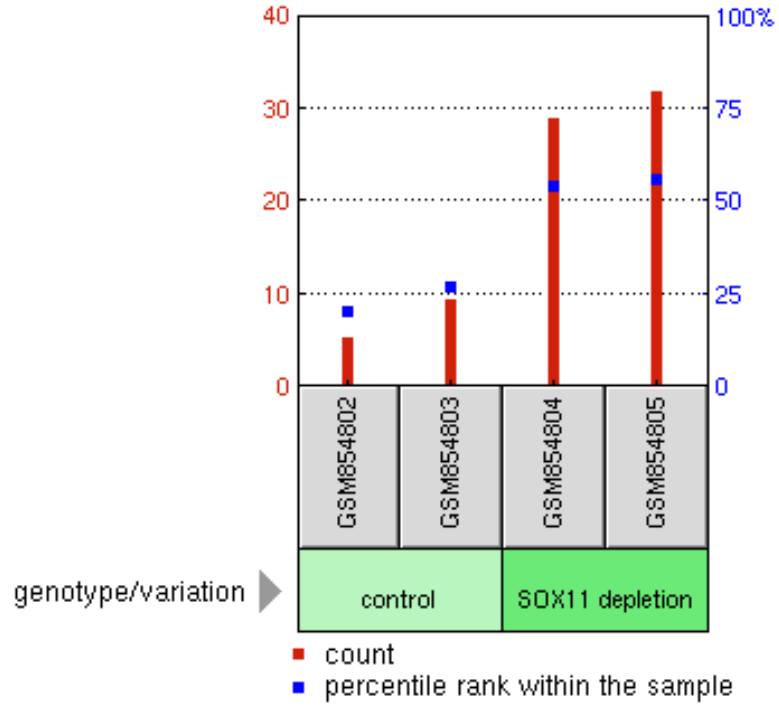
Neural transcription factor SOX11 depletion effect on mantle cell lymphoma cell line

==== Neural transcription factor SOX11 depletion effect on mantle cell lymphoma cell line ====
This study was conducted by looking at mantle cell lymphoma cells depleted for the transcription factor SOX11. What is interesting is that FAM71E2 is expressed higher in the SOX11 depleted cells than the control, even though there are SOX11 transcription factors in FAM71E2. It may be possible that these transcription factors exist but are simply not transcribed. Further research on this topic should be conducted.

== Homology ==
Paralogs

FAM71 has many paralogs, especially from FAM71. The paralogs are sorted by similarity. The paralogs in the table were selected based on their e-value and relevance to the FAM71 family. E-value range: 0 to 3e^-11. Similarity range: 100% to 51%.

Select Paralogs of FAM71E2
Protein	E-value	Similarity range
FAM71C	8.00E-22	56
FAM71D	3.00E-21	52
HSD-51	5.00E-21	55
FAM71B	5.00E-21	55
FAM71A	2.00E-20	55
FAM71F1	1.00E-11	51
FAM71F2	3.00E-11	51
FAM71E1	2.00-11	51

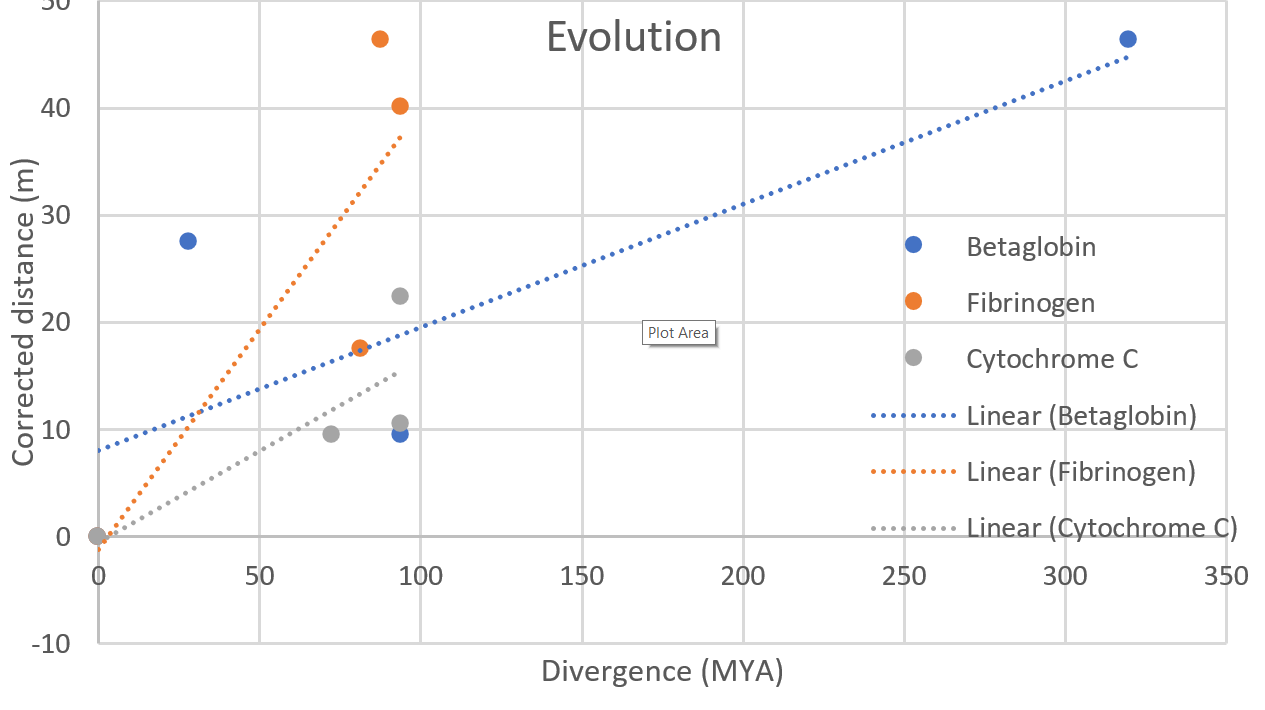
Evolution chart FAM71E2

Orthologs

Select Orthologs of FAM71E2						
Genus and species	Common name	accession	sequence length	Percent Identity	Percent Similarity	Date of divergence (MYA)
Homo sapiens	Humans	NP_001138874.1	922	100	100	0
Papio anubus	Olive baboon	XP_003916175.2	865	79.54	82	28.1
Galeopterus variegatus	Sunda flying lemur	XP_008589520.1	876	60.74	70	82
Ictidomys tridecemlineatus	Thirteen-lined ground squirrel	XP_021576662.1	1028	55.11	70	88
Vulpes vulpes	Red fox	XP_004777071.1	826	54.23	65	94
Pteropus vampyrus	Large flying fox	XP_023378500.1	937	52.92	64	94
Vicugna pacos	Alpaca	XP_006216382.1	865	53.7	64	94
Chrysemys pica bellii	Western painted turtle	XP_008174220.1	217	50	67	320
Pogona vitticeps	Central bearded dragon	XP_020634337.1	689	33.67	55	320

== Interacting proteins ==
There are several interacting proteins with FAM71E2. One protein interaction program predicted NOTCH2NL, P60369, ALB, and MTUS2 interact with FAM71E2. NOTCH2NL might have a role in the Notch signaling pathway as well as regulating neutrophil differentiation. P60369 is a hair keratin-associated protein. ALB functions as a regulator of colloidal osmotic pressure of blood, as well as a major zinc transporter. MTUS2 main function is to bind microtubules.

Another protein interaction program predicted BOD1L2, FAM200A, CCT8L2, OR9G1, and AMPD3 interact with FAM71E2. BOD1L2 may have a role in biorientation via mitotic spindles. CCT8L2 assists folding proteins after ATP hydrolysis. OR9G1 functions as an odorant receptor. AMPD3 functions in energy metabolism. FAM200A has no known function.

== Future research ==
Based on expression data, there are several topics that can be explored to learn more about the exact function of FAM71E2.

- Further studies should look at expression analysis during developmental stages. There was minimal expression in fetus on Human protein atlas. Another study should be conducted to determine if this expression is true or if the results are from an error. The information gathered from the expression analysis for oocyte indicate that FAM71E2 is expressed far lower during embryotic development than in adult humans. This cannot be equated with expression in fetuses, but additional studies should be conducted to determine if, how much, and what stage of development expression exists.
- Additional research should indicate if FAM71E2 is expressed more, less or equally in breast tissue and breast tumors.
- Further research on SOX11 transcription factor expression.
