= Mir-192/215 microRNA precursor =

mir-192/215 microRNA precursor
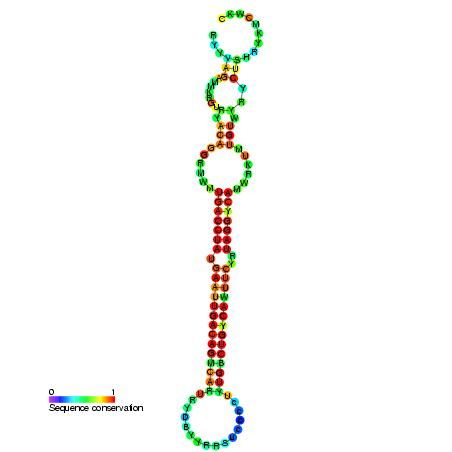
- Predicted secondary structure and sequence conservation of mir-192

Identifiers
- Symbol: mir-192
- Rfam: RF00130
- miRBase: MI0000234
- miRBase family: MIPF0000063

Other data
- RNA type: Gene; miRNA
- Domain(s): Eukaryota
- GO: GO:0035195 GO:0035068
- SO: SO:0001244
- PDB structures: PDBe

The miR-192 microRNA precursor (homologous to miR-215), is a short non-coding RNA gene involved in gene regulation. miR-192 and miR-215 have now been predicted or experimentally confirmed in mouse and human.

microRNAs are transcribed as ~70 nucleotide precursors and subsequently processed by the Dicer enzyme to give a ~22 nucleotide product. In this case the mature sequence comes from the 5' arm of the precursor. The mature products are thought to have regulatory roles through complementarity to mRNA.

mir-192 and mir-215 are overexpressed in gastric cancer, and could be used as biomarkers or therapeutic targets. It has also been suggested that mir-192 could be used as a biomarker for drug-induced liver damage.

miR-215 and miR-192 are also both implicated in major depressive disorder. Small-RNA sequencing reveals upregulated expression for both miR-215 and miR-192 in the synaptosomes derived from the dorsolateral prefrontal cortex of MDD subjects.
