= BASP1 =

Protein-coding gene in the species Homo sapiens

Identifiers
- Aliases: BASP1, CAP-23, CAP23, NAP-22, NAP22, brain abundant membrane attached signal protein 1
- External IDs: OMIM: 605940; MGI: 1917600; GeneCards: BASP1

Gene location (Human)
Chr.	Chromosome 5 (human)
Band	5p15.1	Start	17,065,598 bp
Band	5p15.1	End	17,276,843 bp

Gene location (Mouse)
Chr.	Chromosome 15 (mouse)
Band	15|15 B1	Start	25,363,363 bp
Band	15|15 B1	End	25,413,850 bp
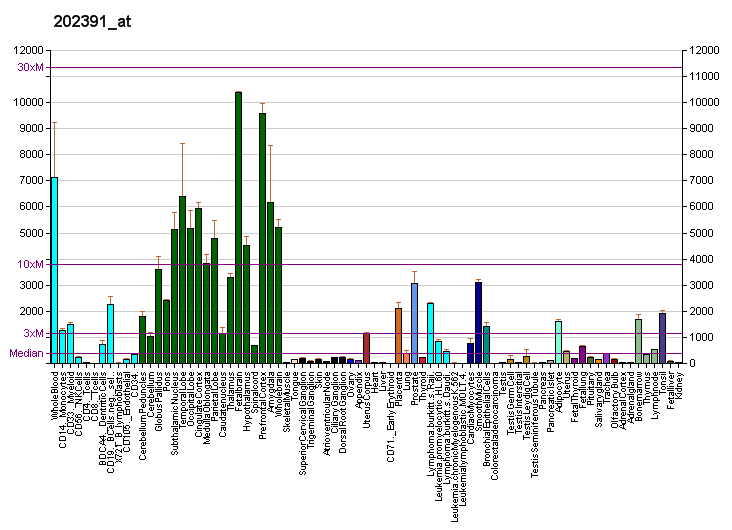
RNA expression pattern
Bgee	Human / Mouse (ortholog); Top expressed in: orbitofrontal cortex; middle temporal gyrus; frontal pole; Brodmann area 46; Brodmann area 23; Brodmann area 10; superior frontal gyrus; parietal lobe; postcentral gyrus; occipital lobe / Top expressed in: perirhinal cortex; CA3 field; entorhinal cortex; retinal pigment epithelium; amygdala; cingulate gyrus; prefrontal cortex; barrel cortex; trigeminal ganglion; primary motor cortex; More reference expression data
BioGPS	More reference expression data
Gene ontology
Molecular function	transcription corepressor activity; protein domain specific binding; protein binding
Cellular component	cytoplasm; vesicle; nuclear speck; cell projection; membrane; growth cone; plasma membrane; cell junction; COP9 signalosome; extracellular exosome; cytoskeleton; nucleus
Biological process	substantia nigra development; diaphragm development; positive regulation of metanephric ureteric bud development; positive regulation of heart growth; glomerular visceral epithelial cell differentiation; thorax and anterior abdomen determination; negative regulation of transcription, DNA-templated; gonad development; metanephric mesenchyme development; mesenchymal to epithelial transition
Sources:Amigo / QuickGO
Orthologs
Databases	NCBI: entry; OMA: entry
Species	Human	Mouse
Entrez	10409	70350
Ensembl	ENSG00000176788	ENSMUSG00000045763
UniProt	P80723	Q91XV3
RefSeq (mRNA)	NM_006317; NM_001271606	NM_027395
RefSeq (protein)	NP_001258535; NP_006308	NP_081671
Location (UCSC)	Chr 5: 17.07 – 17.28 Mb	Chr 15: 25.36 – 25.41 Mb
PubMed search
- Wikidata
View/Edit Human	View/Edit Mouse

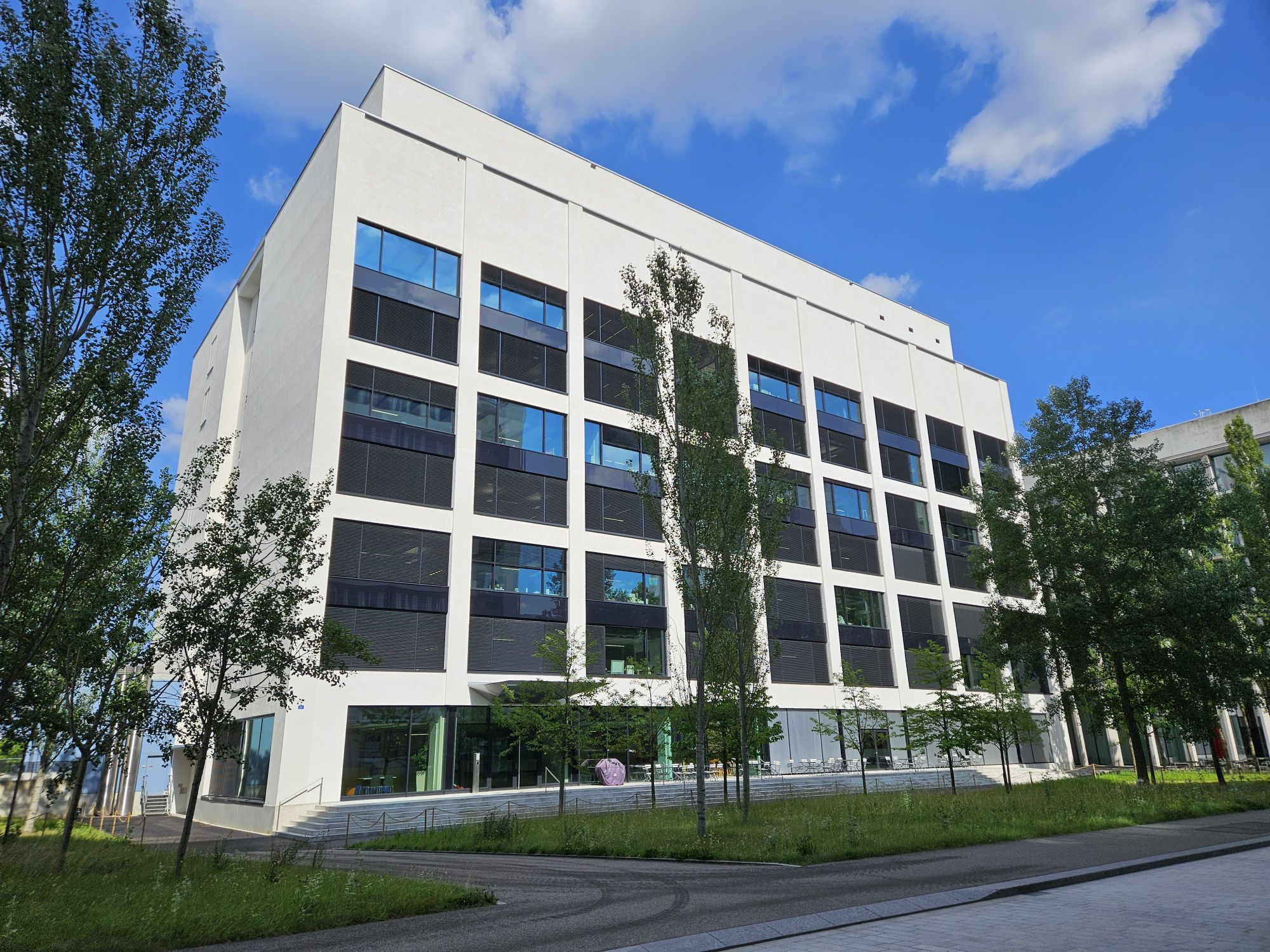
Friedrich Miescher Institute on Novartis St. Johann Campus

Brain acid soluble protein 1 is a protein that in humans is encoded by the BASP1 gene.

BASP1 (Brain acid soluble protein 1) is a 22Kd, N-terminal Myristoylated protein involved in gene regulation, cytoplasmic signaling in neurons, axon regeneration and a variety of other functions. BASP1 is encoded by the BASP1 gene and is part of the GMC protein family with GAP-43 and MARCKS. Although BASP1 has been mainly identified as a tumor suppressor, upregulation of BASP1 has been seen in several cancers and offers poor prognosis.

== Discovery ==
BASP1 was discovered in 1990 in Friedrich Miescher Institute, Basel, Switzerland by Franco Widmer and Pico Caroni. They found BASP1 in the brains of chickens, while looking for proteins with a similar distribution to GAP-43 which is also neuroprotective. It was initially believed to only be a cytoplasmic signaling protein in neurons, however it was subsequently discovered to be in the nucleus and then found to be involved in transcriptional regulation. It was found to be a cofactor of WT1 (Wilms tumor protein 1) which is a known transcriptional regulator and oncogene, causing Wilms tumors in children.

== Structure ==
The BASP1 gene is located on chromosome five and is approximately 59,204 base pairs long and the gene has a total of 2 exons.

BASP1, a 227 amino acid protein, has several important structural features: including PEST motifs, cholesterol binding motifs, and phosphorylation sites. BASP1 is also myristoylated at the N-terminal, at Glycine residue 2. PEST motifs are seen in proteins with high turnover rates. BASP1 is able to interact with phospholipids like PIP through its myristoylation and localistation to the various cellular membranes.

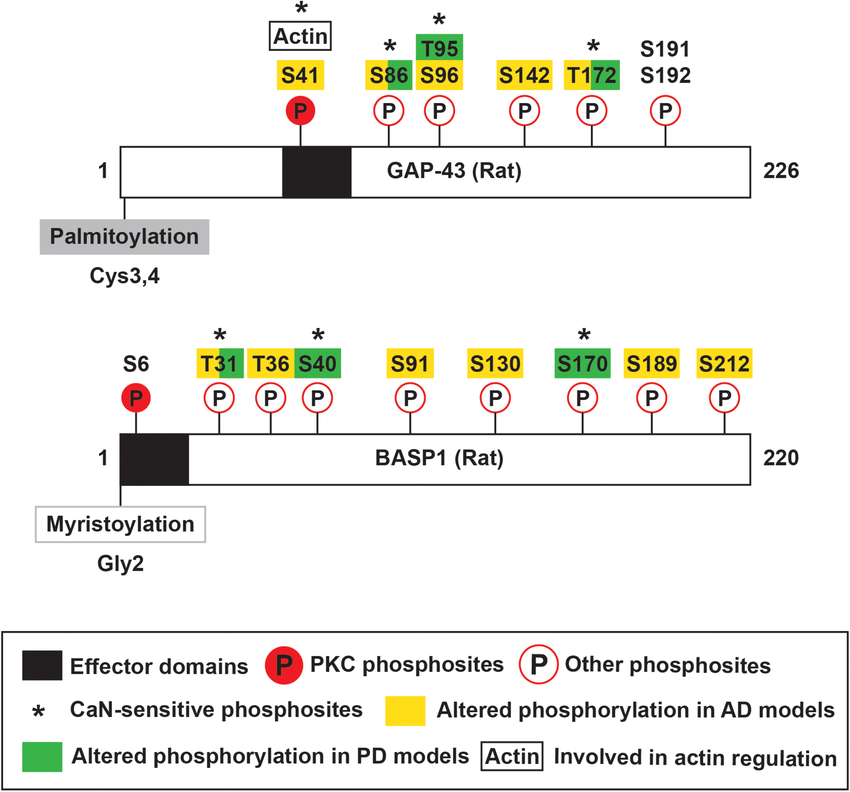
Image of BASP1 nd GAP-43 protein structure.

Although the predicted molecular weight of BASP1 is 22 kD, it is apparent molecular weight on western blots is 50 and 70 kD in size. This is not affected by its myristoylation, and is not entirely understood and may be caused by its unique structure.

== Function ==
=== At a cellular level ===
BASP1 recruits HDAC1 (Histone de-deacetylase 1) and other histone modifying proteins to modify chromatin to repress genes. While some modifications require myristolation of BASP1, others appear to not require myristylation. BASP1 can also recruit cholesterol, through its cholesterol binding motif, to the promoters of genes, thus repressing gene expression. BASP1 binds to and/or regulates several oncogenic proteins, including WT1. It is believed to play a key role in keeping the cell in a differentiated state, thus representing a particular cell type. This is likely done by BASP1's repression of the Yamanaka factors, which are involved in inducing pluripotent stem cells. BASP1 knockout causes high neonatal lethality, with 5-10% surviving to adulthood.

- BASP1 and MYC: MYC is a master gene regulator that binds to DNA. MYC promotes proliferation, growth, metabolism... This makes MYC oncogenic if upregulated in the cell, with upregulation of MYC being present in 60-70% of cancers. BASP1 downregulates MYC by displacing calmodulin (a calcium-detecting protein) from MYC. This then results in MYC's stability decreasing, potentially explaining MYC repression by BASP1.
- BASP1 and WT1: BASP1 binds to WT1 an oncoprotein and acts as a corepressor, repressing the gene that WT1 is bound to the promoter of. BASP1 does this through chromatin modifiers.
- BASP1 and estrogen receptor alpha; BASP1 has been seen enhancing the effect of Tamoxifen in the treatment of breast cancers. The anticancer drug tamoxifen acts by binding to and acting as an antagonist to estrogen receptors. BASP1 in the cytoplasm has been seen to colocalize with the receptor in the nucleolus. This results in BASP1 enhancing Tamoxifen's effect and preventing resistance to Tamoxifen by repressing genes that could allow for resistance. Approximately 40% of the genes affected by Tamoxifen are BASP1-dependent.
- BASP1 regulates RANKL (receptor and activator of NFkB ligand); RANKL promotes differentiation of monocytes and macrophages into osteoclasts, which reabsorb bone. Increased expression of BASP1 has been seen to downregulate RANKL, which is also associated with cell survival and proliferation, leading to cancers through the NFkB, MAPK, and Src pathways.
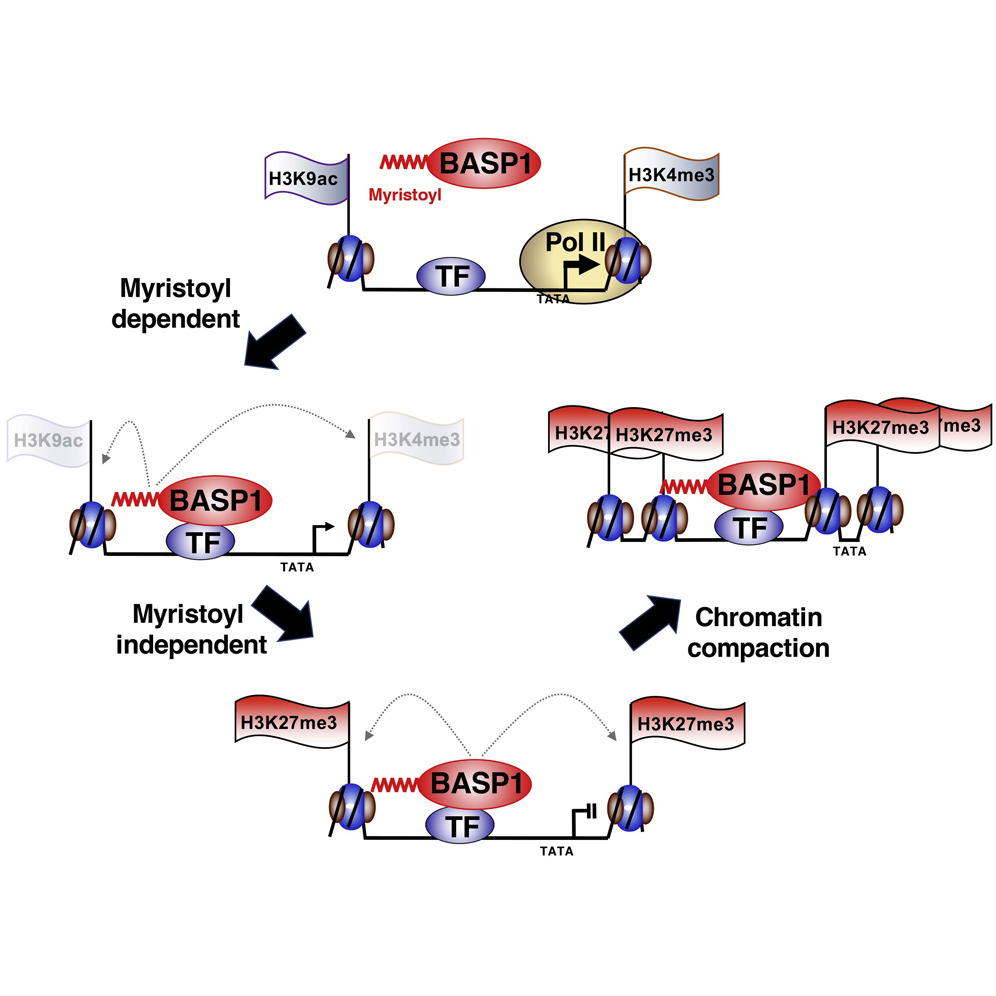
  Image of BASP1 acting as a corepressor.
- BASP1 as an oncogene: Although known as a tumor suppressor, BASP1 is also associated with bad prognosis in several cancers, like in gastric cancer and lung cancers. This is believed to be due to its ability to regulate the immune system, promote immune cell markers, immune cell infiltration, regulation of immune checkpoints and also having connections to proinflammatory signaling, which is often oncogenic.
- BASP1 interacting with cellular membranes and actin: As BASP1 localises to both the nuclear and cell membrane through its fatty acid Myristoylated tails and influences membrane dynamics. BASP1 localises to lipid rafts on the cell membrane and is thought to influence actin dynamics and membrane dynamics there, possibly by according to (Caroni, 2001) concentrating PI(4,5)P2 in the area, which enhances and recruits actin-modifying proteins. In Mitochondrial fission, BASP1 was found to be involved in recruiting actin to the mitochondria and driving fission. This is mediated by different phosphorylated states of BASP1.

=== In the body as a whole ===
BASP1 is highly expressed within the brain, lungs, bone marrow, kidneys, lymphoid tissues, and the male and female reproductive tissues.

- In the Brain and nervous system

BASP1 is highly expressed in the nervous system and has a variety of different uses within it. In the brain, it promotes neural development, synaptic plasticity, and axonal regeneration. BASP1 does this by localising to the cell membrane at axon junctions and neural growth cones. BASP1 modulates the actin cytoskeleton, which is how they promote neurological development, neural regeneration, and their synaptic function.

Image of BASP1 created in ImageJ

BASP1 is neuroprotective with GAP-43. Damage to the CNS resulting in the release of cytokines and neurotrophins, which result in increased expression and phosphorylation of BASP1 and GAP-43 proteins which protect and repair the neurons. Although BASP1 and GAP-43 are neuroprotective and involved in neuronal repair, decreased levels of both proteins have been seen in neurodegenerative diseases, like Alzheimer's and Parkinson's.

- In the kidneys

BASP1 in the kidneys is key for kidney development, and then after differentiation, BASP1 is mostly found within podocytes, which regulate kidney filtration of the blood in the glomerulus. Podocytes also continue to express WT1 in high concentrations, which BASP1 corepresses.

- In the skeleton

In bones, BASP1 is known to regulate bone degradation by suppressing bone reabsorbing cells known as osteoclasts, which is why there is increased BASP1 expression.

- Reproductive tissues

For the male reproductive tissues, BASP1 appears to be important in sperm development and differentiation, which is constantly occurring as new sperm are produced constantly. In female reproductive tissues, BASP1 is likely acting as a corepressor of the estrogen receptor and regulating it.

== Current research ==
Several institutions are currently researching BASP1, and the number of published papers mentioning BASP1 has increased in the last year (2025), with 24 papers published on PubMed. This is the highest number on record, and a rapid increase from previous years, with the average number of papers mentioning BASP1 each year being nine since the year 2000. This shows increased interest in the protein.
