= Golgi-associated RAB2 interactor protein 3 =

Protein-coding gene in the species Homo sapiens

GARIN3

Identifiers
- Aliases: GARIN3, family with sequence similarity 71 member B, golgi associated RAB2B interactor family member 3, FAM71B, GARI-L3
- External IDs: MGI: 3650836; HomoloGene: 51067; GeneCards: GARIN3; OMA:GARIN3 - orthologs

Gene location (Human)
Chr.	Chromosome 5 (human)
Band	5q33.3	Start	157,161,846 bp
Band	5q33.3	End	157,166,264 bp

Gene location (Mouse)
Chr.	Chromosome 11 (mouse)
Band	11 B1.1|11	Start	46,287,386 bp
Band	11 B1.1|11	End	46,298,809 bp
RNA expression pattern
Bgee	Human / Mouse (ortholog); Top expressed in: testicle; sperm; left testis; right testis; human musculoskeletal system; muscular system; skeletal muscle; lower limb muscles; connective tissue; muscle of leg / Top expressed in: seminiferous tubule; spermatid; granulocyte; embryo; spermatocyte; thymus; right kidney; olfactory epithelium; blood; spleen; More reference expression data
BioGPS	n/a
Orthologs
Species	Human	Mouse
Entrez	153745	432552
Ensembl	ENSG00000170613	ENSMUSG00000020401
UniProt	Q8TC56	Q5STT6
RefSeq (mRNA)	NM_130899	NM_001013783
RefSeq (protein)	NP_570969	NP_001013805
Location (UCSC)	Chr 5: 157.16 – 157.17 Mb	Chr 11: 46.29 – 46.3 Mb
PubMed search
- Wikidata
View/Edit Human	View/Edit Mouse

Golgi-associated RAB2 interactor protein 3 is a protein that in humans is encoded by the GARIN3 gene.
