= Harry Schachter =

Canadian biochemist (1933–2024)

Harry Schachter FRSC
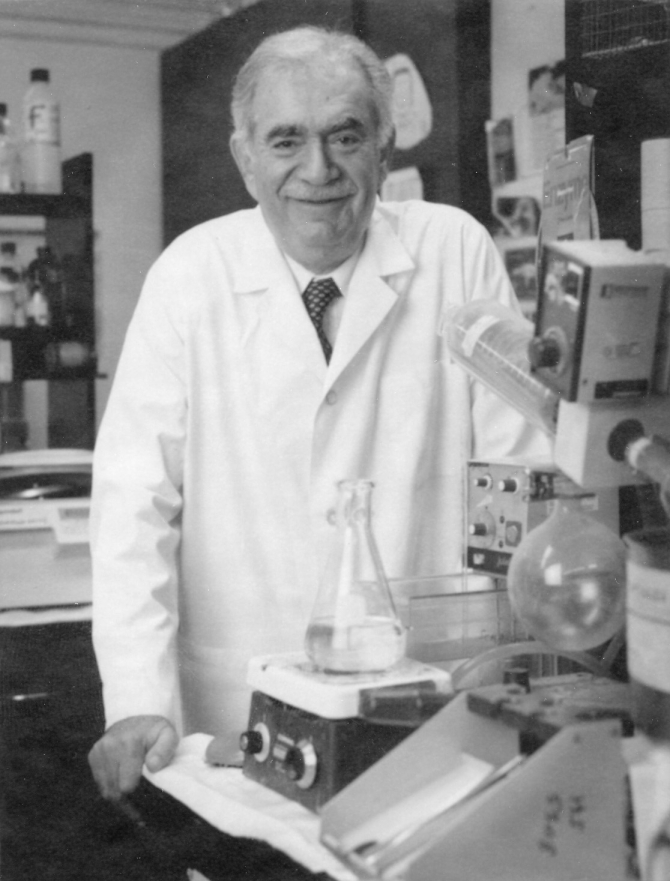
- Born: 25 February 1933; Vienna, Austria
- Died: 17 April 2024 (aged 91); Toronto, Ontario, Canada
- Citizenship: Canada
- Education: University of Toronto
- Known for: Glycosyltransferases, branched oligosaccharides, N- and O-linked glycans
- Spouse: Judy Schachter (Jakubovic) (m. 1958)
- Children: Aviva Eisen, Asher Schachter
- Awards: Fellow of the Royal Society of Canada, Cody Medal, Starr Medal, the Austrian Cross of Honour for Science and Art First Class, Rosalind Kornfeld Award for Lifetime Achievement in Glycobiology.
- Scientific career
- Fields: Biochemistry
- Workplaces: Hospital For Sick Children University of Toronto
- Doctoral advisor: Gordon Dixon

Harry Schachter FRSC (25 February 1933 – 17 April 2024) was a Canadian biochemist and glycobiologist. He was professor at the University of Toronto and at the Hospital For Sick Children in Toronto.

== Biography ==
Harry Schachter was born in Vienna, Austria in 1933. His parents were Miriam Freund, a businesswoman, and Ulrich Schachter, a dentist and medical doctor. Harry's father was the cousin of Austro-Hungarian and Romanian tenor and actor, Joseph Schmidt. The Schachter family fled the Nazis in 1938, escaping to Port of Spain, Trinidad. He attended secondary school at Saint Mary's College. He came first in Trinidad in the Cambridge Advanced Level Examinations and won the Jerningham Gold Medal and the Island Scholarship in Mathematics. He also worked part-time as a reporter for the local Guardian newspaper. His family immigrated to Toronto, Canada in 1951.

=== Education and career ===
At the University of Toronto, Schachter completed his BA in Physiology and Biochemistry in 1955, his MD in 1959, and his PhD in Biochemistry (Gordon Dixon, supervisor) in 1964. After completing his PhD, he was appointed an assistant professor in the Department of Biochemistry. He did his post-doctoral work in glycobiology with Saul Roseman at Johns Hopkins University from 1966 to 1968. He returned to the University of Toronto in 1968, where he established his laboratory in the Department of Biochemistry.

In 1976, Schachter took a position in the Division of Biochemistry Research at the Hospital for Sick Children, which he headed for 13 years. From 1984 to 1989, he was chairman of the Department of Biochemistry at the University of Toronto.

His contributions to the field of carbohydrate biochemistry include the discovery and characterization of 12 glycosyltransferases involved in the synthesis of N- and O-linked glycans, thereby defining processes crucial for the formation of branched oligosaccharides on glycoproteins that include cell surface receptors and secreted proteins. Schachter also helped characterize the first Carbohydrate-Deficient Glycoprotein Syndrome (CDG-IIa; now known as Congenital Disorders of Glycosylation). He helped show that GnTII null mice are excellent models for human CDG-IIa. Other work on mice involving null mutations in GnTI, GnTII and GnTIII established the importance of N-glycans in metazoan development. Additionally, Schachter explored the biological functions of complex carbohydrates in Drosophila brain development that demonstrated a tissue-specific role in the regulation of insulin signalling and life span. His translational/clinical work also included enzymatic discoveries in the complex muscle-eye-brain diseases (e.g. congenital muscular dystrophy) associated with defective O-glycosylation. He published over 160 scientific papers, reviews, and commentaries.

Schachter served as post-doctoral supervisor and mentor to scientists in his laboratory, and collaborated with these and other scientists in Canada, Europe, Japan, Australia and the United States. Collaborators included David Williams, Inka Brockhausen, Clifford Lingwood, Mohan Sarkar, Pamela Stanley, Noam Harpaz, Louis Siminovitch, Jeremy Carver, Hudson Freeze, Jaak Jaeken, Jamey Marth, Hans Vliegenthart, Vernon Reinhold, Reinhart Reithmeier, Kevin Campbell, Gabrielle Boulianne, Paul Gleeson, Richard Simpson, Jenny Tan, Andrew Spence, Folkert Reck, Jiri Vajsar, Saroja Narasimhan, Bob (RK) Murray, GD Longmore, Jenny Chan, and Brad Bendiak.

=== Death ===
Schachter died in Toronto on 17 April 2024, at the age of 91.

== Awards and honors ==
- 2011: Austrian Cross of Honour for Science and Art First Class
- 2010: Rosalind Kornfeld Award for Lifetime Achievement in Glycobiology.
- 2000: Elected to the Johns Hopkins University Society of Scholars, Baltimore MD
- 1998: Karl Meyer Award of the Society for Glycobiology.
- 1998: Honorary degree, Universität der Bodenkultur (BOKU), Vienna, Austria.
- 1989,1990,1992: visiting professor, Universitat der Bodenkultur, Vienna, Austria.
- 1995: Elected as a Fellow of the Royal Society of Canada
- 1990s: member and chair of the Medical Review Panel of the Gairdner Foundation International Awards
- 1989: Sandoz Lecture, Clinical Research Society of Toronto.
- 1989: visiting professor, Donders Chair, University of Utrecht, Netherlands.
- 1985: Boehringer Mannheim Prize in Biochemistry
- 1981: Terry Fox Special Initiatives Program research award for cancer research
- 1964: Starr Medal (University of Toronto, Postgraduate Research)
- 1959: Cody Silver Medal (University of Toronto, Faculty of Medicine)
- 1957: Alpha Omega Alpha Honor Medical Society
