= Gordon Dixon =

Gordon Dixon may refer to:

- Gordon Dixon (biochemist) (1930–2016), Canadian biochemist and professor
- Gordon Dixon (rugby union), Scottish rugby union player
- Gordon Dixon (footballer) (born 1936), Australian rules footballer

== See also ==
- Gordon Dickson (disambiguation)
