= Glucuronosyl-N-acetylglucosaminyl-proteoglycan 4-alpha-N-acetylglucosaminyltransferase =

Class of enzymes

Identifiers
- EC no.: 2.4.1.224
- CAS no.: 336193-98-7

Databases
- BRENDA: enzyme data
- ExPASy: NiceZyme view
- KEGG: enzyme entry
- MetaCyc: metabolic pathway
- Rhea: reactions
- PDB structures: RCSB PDB PDBe PDBsum
Search
- PMC: articles
- PubMed: articles
- NCBI: proteins

Glucuronosyl-N-acetylglucosaminyl-proteoglycan 4-alpha-N-acetylglucosaminyltransferase (EC 2.4.1.224, alpha-N-acetylglucosaminyltransferase II glucuronyl-N-acetylglucosaminylproteoglycan alpha-1,4-N-acetylglucosaminyltransferase) is an enzyme with systematic name UDP-N-acetyl-D-glucosamine:beta-D-glucuronosyl-(1->4)-N-acetyl-alpha-D-glucosaminyl-proteoglycan 4-alpha-N-acetylglucosaminyltransferase. This enzyme catalyses the following chemical reaction

UDP-N-acetyl-D-glucosamine + beta-D-glucuronosyl-(1->4)-N-acetyl-alpha-D-glucosaminyl-proteoglycan $\rightleftharpoons$ UDP + N-acetyl-alpha-D-glucosaminyl-(1->4)-beta-D-glucuronosyl-(1->4)-N-acetyl-alpha-D-glucosaminyl-proteoglycan

This enzyme is involved in the biosynthesis of heparin and heparan sulfate. In humans, isoforms of this enzyme are encoded by the genes EXT2 and EXTL1.
