= USV =

USV may refer to:

== Businesses and organizations ==
- Union Square Ventures, an American venture capital company
- University of Silicon Valley
- USV Private Limited, an Indian pharmaceutical company

== Government and military ==
- United States of Venezuela
- United States Volunteers, non-regular US Army troops

== Science and technology ==
- Ultrasonic vocalization by animals such as bats and rodents
- Unmanned surface vehicle, a remote-operated ocean vessel
- Microsievert units of radiation (µSv)
- 76 mm divisional gun M1939 (USV), a WWII Soviet field gun
