= EXT3 =

EXT3 can refer to:

- The ext3 journaling filesystem for Linux
- EXT3 (gene)
