= Hereditary multiple exostoses =

Rare skeletal disorder

Hereditary multiple osteochondromas
- Other names: Hereditary multiple exostoses
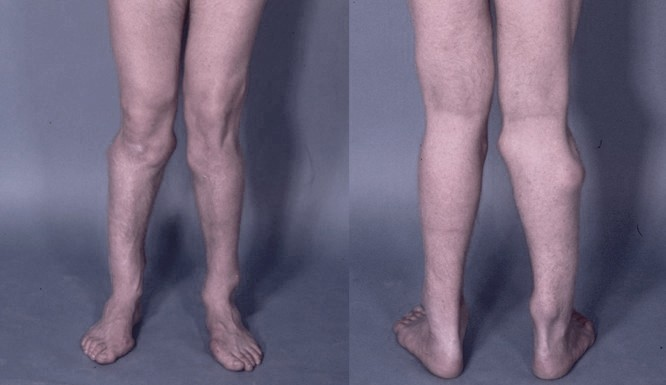
- Photograph of the legs of a 26-year-old male showing multiple lumps leading to deformity
- Specialty: Medical genetics

Hereditary multiple osteochondromas (HMO), also known as hereditary multiple exostoses, is a disorder characterized by the development of multiple benign osteocartilaginous masses (exostoses) in relation to the ends of long bones of the lower limbs such as the femurs and tibias and of the upper limbs such as the humeri and forearm bones. They are also known as osteochondromas. Additional sites of occurrence include on flat bones such as the pelvic bone and scapula. The distribution and number of these exostoses show a wide diversity among affected individuals. Exostoses usually present during childhood. The vast majority of affected individuals become clinically manifest by the time they reach adolescence. The incidence of hereditary multiple exostoses is around 1 in 50,000 individuals. Hereditary multiple osteochondromas is the preferred term used by the World Health Organization. A small percentage of affected individuals are at risk for development of sarcomas as a result of malignant transformation. The risk that people with hereditary multiple osteochondromas have a 1 in 20 to 1 in 200 lifetime risk of developing sarcomas.

== Presentation ==
A noticeable lump in relation to an extremity may be the first presenting symptom. Multiple deformities can arise, namely coronal plane deformities around the knees, ankles, shoulders, elbows, and wrists. For example, genu valgum (knock knees), ankle valgus, ulnar bowing and shortening, and radial head subluxation are encountered. The majority of affected individuals have clinically manifest osteochondromas around the knee. Forearm involvement in HMO is considerable. Intra-articular osteochondromas of the hip can induce limitation of range of motion, joint pain and acetabular dysplasia. Likewise joint pain at other locations and neurovascular compression can occur. Furthermore, functional disability in regard to activities of daily living can be a presenting feature. Spinal deformity pain or neurological compromise should arouse suspicion of involvement of the vertebrae. Furthermore, short stature may occur and is generally disproportionate. Such manifestations usually result from disruption of physeal growth especially that osteochondromas typically arise at the metaphyseal ends of long bones in close proximity to the physis.

=== Pain ===
According to self-reports, a far majority of patients experience pain, and about half experience generalized pain. Individuals who had HME-related complications were five times more likely to have pain, while those who had surgery were 3.8 times more likely to have pain. No differences were found between males and females with respect to pain, surgery, or HME-related complications.

=== Possible connection to autism ===
Some parents of children with HME have observed autism-like social problems in their children. To explore those observations more deeply, a 2012 study by the Sanford-Burnham Medical Research Institute used a mouse model of HME to observe cognitive function. The findings indicated that the mutant mice endorsed three autistic characteristics: social impairment, impairments in ultrasonic vocalization, and repetitive behavior.

=== Heparan sulfate connections ===
MHE stems from an inability to biosynthesize heparan sulfate, a proteoglycan. As Cuellar et al. note: "[E]ncoding glycosyltransferases involved in the biosynthesis of ubiquitously expressed heparan sulphate (HS) chains, are associated with MHE."

== Genetics ==
HME is an autosomal dominant hereditary disorder. This means that individuals with HME have a 50% chance of transmitting this disorder to their children. Most individuals with HME have a parent who also has the condition; however, approximately 10–20% of individuals with HME have the condition as a result of a spontaneous mutation and are thus the first person in their family to be affected.

HME has thus far been linked with mutations in three genes:

- EXT1 which maps to chromosome 8q24.1
- EXT2 which maps to 11p13
- EXT3 which maps to the short arm of chromosome 19 (though its exact location has yet to be precisely determined)

Mutations in these genes typically lead to the synthesis of a truncated EXT protein which does not function normally. It is known that EXT proteins are important enzymes in the synthesis of heparan sulfate proteoglycans; however, the exact mechanism by which altered synthesis of heparan sulfate that could lead to the abnormal bone growth associated with HME is unclear. It is thought that normal chondrocyte proliferation and differentiation may be affected, leading to abnormal bone growth. Since the HME genes are involved in the synthesis of a glycan (heparan sulfate), HME may be considered a congenital disorder of glycosylation according to the new CDG nomenclature suggested in 2009.

For individuals with HME who are considering starting a family, preimplantation genetic testing and prenatal diagnosis are available to determine if their unborn child has inherited the disease. HME has a 96% penetrance, which means that if the affected gene is indeed transmitted to a child, the child will have a 96% of actually manifesting the disease, and 4% chance of having the disease but never manifesting it. The 96% penetrance figure comes from only one study. Other studies have observed both incomplete and variable penetrance but without calculating the % penetrance, e.g. In both the aforementioned studies the symptomless individuals carrying the faulty gene were predominantly female, leading to speculation that incomplete penetrance is more likely to be exhibited in females. Indeed, other work has shown that males tend to have worse disease than females, as well as that the number of exostoses in affected members of the same family can vary greatly. It is also possible for females to be severely affected. Severity of symptoms varies between individuals, even in the same family.

Symptoms are more likely to be severe if the mutation is on the ext1 gene rather than ext2 or ext3; ext1 is also the most commonly affected gene in patients of this disorder.

== Pathophysiology ==
It is characterized by the growth of cartilage-capped benign bone tumours around areas of active bone growth, particularly the metaphysis of the long bones. Typically five or six exostoses are found in upper and lower limbs. Image depicts adult regrowth after knee replacement.

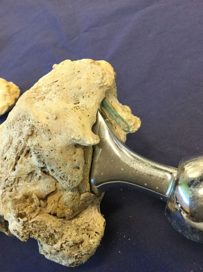
Skeleton of 92-year-old woman with MHE who had knee replacements at age 70. See FIRS Colorado Mesa University.

Most common locations are:

- Distal femur (70%)
- Proximal tibia (70%)
- Humerus (50%)
- Proximal fibula (30%)

HME can lead to the shortening and bowing of bones; affected individuals often have a short stature. Depending on their location the exostoses can cause problems including: pain or numbness from nerve compression, vascular compromise, inequality of limb length, irritation of tendon and muscle, Madelung's deformity as well as a limited range of motion at the joints upon which they encroach. A person with HME has an increased risk of developing a rare form of bone cancer called chondrosarcoma as an adult. Problems may be had in later life and these could include weak bones and nerve damage. The reported rate of transformation ranges from as low as 0.57% to as high as 8.3% of people with HME. Some authors have described an association between HME and the presence of popliteal pseudoaneurysms.

== Diagnosis ==
The diagnosis of HMO is based upon establishing an accurate correlation between the above-mentioned clinical features and the characteristic radiographic features. Family history can provide an important clue to the diagnosis. This is supplemented by testing for the two genes in which pathogenic variants are known to cause HMO namely EXT1 and EXT2. A combination of sequence analysis and deletion analysis of the entire coding regions of both EXT1 and EXT2 detects pathogenic variants in 70–95% of affected individuals. The hallmark of radiographic diagnosis is the presence of osteochondromas at the metaphyseal ends of long bones in which the cortex and medulla of the osteochondroma represent a continuous extension of the host bone. This is readily demonstrable in radiographs of the knees.

== Treatment ==
The indications for surgical intervention in individuals with HMO vary across the medical literature. In general surgical treatment of HMO includes one or more of the following procedures: ostechondroma excision, gradual or acute bone lengthening such as the ulna lengthening, corrective osteotomies, temporary hemiepiphysiodesis to correct angular joint deformities such as distal radius hemiepiphysiodesis and medial distal tibial hemiepiphysiodesis. The success of surgery is not well-correlated with specific patient or disease characteristics, making it challenging to predict who will benefit most from intervention. Surgery may be most appropriate for patients with severe functional impairments, pain, or progressive deformities. To enhance the amount of evidence in the medical literature certain recommendations have been put forward. The construction of well-designed prospective studies that can provide a more clear relationship between surgical procedures, patient characteristics and outcomes is on high demand. Otherwise, following the current study designs will continue to raise more questions than answers. Total hip arthroplasty has been used to remedy severe and painful HMO of the hip joint. Total hip arthroplasty in individuals with HMO is challenging because of distortion of anatomy and repeated surgeries performed to address complaints related to exostosis.

== Epidemiology ==
HME is estimated to occur in 1 in 50,000 people.

== See also ==
Wikibooks: Hereditary Multiple Exostoses:

== Additional images ==
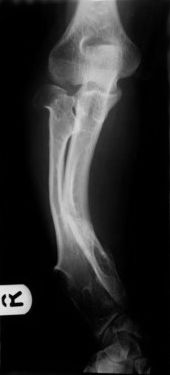
Multiple osteochondromas causing deformity of the forearm (shortening of the radius with secondary bowing of the ulna)

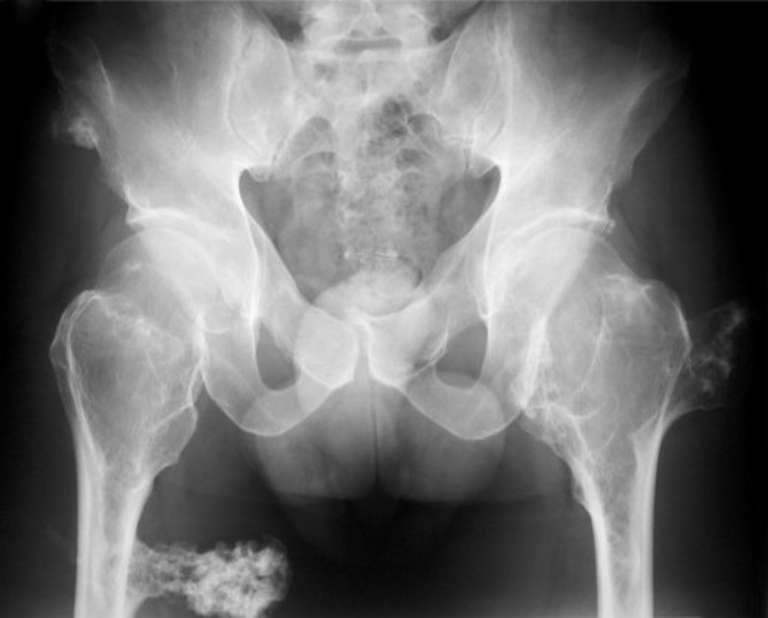
Multiple osteochondromas at the pelvis

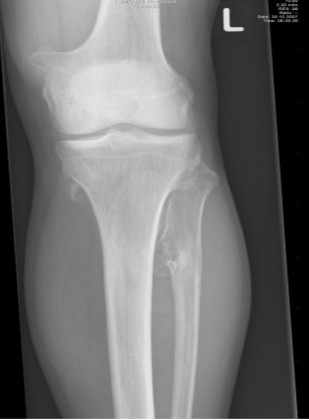
Multiple osteochondromas around the knee

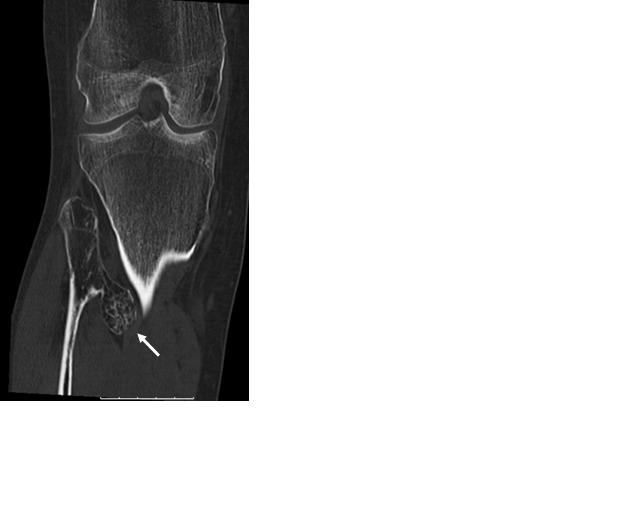
CT of osteochondroma in MO

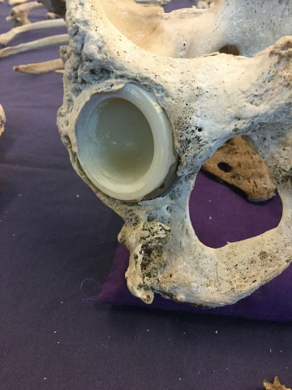
Skeleton of 92-year old woman 20 years after hip replacement
