= EXT2 =

EXT2 can refer to:

- EXT2 (gene), a human gene
- ext2, a file system for the Linux kernel
