= TRAP1 =

Protein-coding gene in the species Homo sapiens

Identifiers
- Aliases: TRAP1, HSP 75, HSP75, HSP90L, TRAP-1, TNF receptor associated protein 1
- External IDs: OMIM: 606219; MGI: 1915265; GeneCards: TRAP1
Available structures
PDB	Ortholog search: PDBe RCSB
PDB	List of PDB id codes 4Z1F, 4Z1G, 4Z1H, 4Z1I, 5F3K, 5F5R

Gene location (Human)
Chr.	Chromosome 16 (human)
Band	16p13.3	Start	3,651,639 bp
Band	16p13.3	End	3,717,553 bp

Gene location (Mouse)
Chr.	Chromosome 16 (mouse)
Band	16 A1|16 2.38 cM	Start	3,857,835 bp
Band	16 A1|16 2.38 cM	End	3,895,691 bp
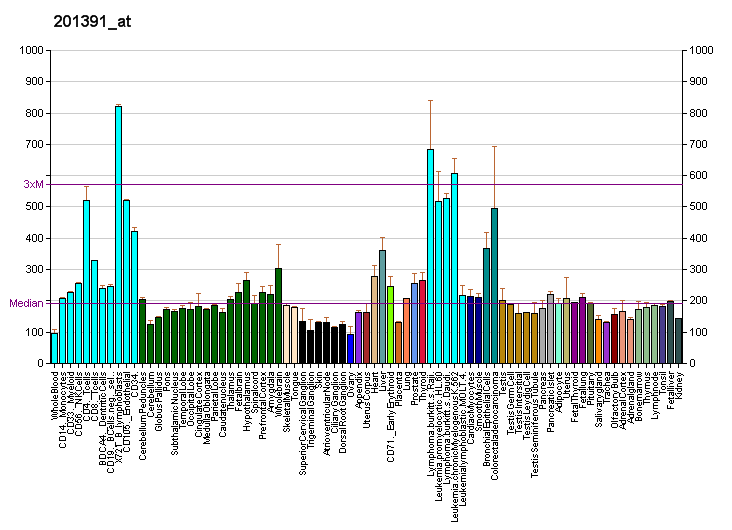
RNA expression pattern
Bgee	Human / Mouse (ortholog); Top expressed in: muscle of thigh; right uterine tube; gastrocnemius muscle; triceps brachii muscle; glutes; right lobe of liver; body of pancreas; apex of heart; skin of leg; skin of abdomen / Top expressed in: right kidney; Paneth cell; muscle of thigh; masseter muscle; proximal tubule; skeletal muscle tissue; brown adipose tissue; fetal liver hematopoietic progenitor cell; human kidney; sternocleidomastoid muscle; More reference expression data
BioGPS	More reference expression data
Gene ontology
Molecular function	nucleotide binding; unfolded protein binding; protein binding; tumor necrosis factor receptor binding; ATP binding; protein kinase binding; RNA binding
Cellular component	membrane; mitochondrial intermembrane space; lipid droplet; nucleoplasm; mitochondrial matrix; mitochondrion; mitochondrial inner membrane; extracellular exosome
Biological process	response to stress; negative regulation of cellular respiration; protein folding; negative regulation of reactive oxygen species biosynthetic process; translational attenuation; chaperone-mediated protein folding; negative regulation of intrinsic apoptotic signaling pathway in response to hydrogen peroxide
Sources:Amigo / QuickGO
Orthologs
Databases	NCBI: entry; OMA: entry
Species	Human	Mouse
Entrez	10131	68015
Ensembl	ENSG00000126602	ENSMUSG00000005981
UniProt	Q12931	Q9CQN1
RefSeq (mRNA)	NM_001272049; NM_016292	NM_026508
RefSeq (protein)	NP_001258978; NP_057376	NP_080784
Location (UCSC)	Chr 16: 3.65 – 3.72 Mb	Chr 16: 3.86 – 3.9 Mb
PubMed search
- Wikidata
View/Edit Human	View/Edit Mouse

Heat shock protein 75 kDa, mitochondrial is a protein that in humans is encoded by the TRAP1 gene.

== Interactions ==
TRAP1 has been shown to interact with EXT2, EXT1 and Retinoblastoma protein.
