= Gordon Dickson =

Gordon Dickson may refer to:

- Gordon Dickson (athlete) (1932–2015), Canadian long-distance runner
- Gordon R. Dickson (1923–2001), Canadian-American science fiction writer
- Gordon Dickson (rugby union) (born 1954), Scotland international rugby union player

== See also ==
- Gordon Dixon (disambiguation)
