= EXT3 (gene) =

Genetic element in the species Homo sapiens

exostoses (multiple) 3

Identifiers
- Symbol: EXT3
- HGNC: 3514
- OMIM: 600209

Other data
- Locus: Chr. 19 p

EXT3 is a human gene.

It is associated with hereditary multiple exostoses.
