= Gordon Dixon (footballer) =

Australian rules footballer

Personal information
- Full name: Gordon Thomas Dixon
- Born: 21 February 1935
- Died: 16 November 2001 (aged 66)
- Original team: Heidelberg
- Height: 185 cm (6 ft 1 in)
- Weight: 78 kg (172 lb)

Playing career^{1}
Years	Club	Games (Goals)
1958	Fitzroy	4 (0)
- ^{1} Playing statistics correct to the end of 1958.

Gordon Thomas Dixon (21 February 1935 – 16 November 2001) was an Australian rules footballer who played with Fitzroy in the Victorian Football League (VFL).
