= EXTL1 =

Protein-coding gene in humans

Identifiers
- Aliases: EXTL1, EXTL, exostosin-like glycosyltransferase 1, exostosin like glycosyltransferase 1
- External IDs: OMIM: 601738; MGI: 1888742; GeneCards: EXTL1
Enzyme activity
EC #	BRENDA	ExPASy	KEGG	MetaCyc
2.4.1.224	↗	↗	↗	↗

Gene location (Human)
Chr.	Chromosome 1 (human)
Band	1p36.11	Start	26,019,884 bp
Band	1p36.11	End	26,036,464 bp

Gene location (Mouse)
Chr.	Chromosome 4 (mouse)
Band	4 D2.3|4 66.63 cM	Start	134,083,683 bp
Band	4 D2.3|4 66.63 cM	End	134,111,161 bp
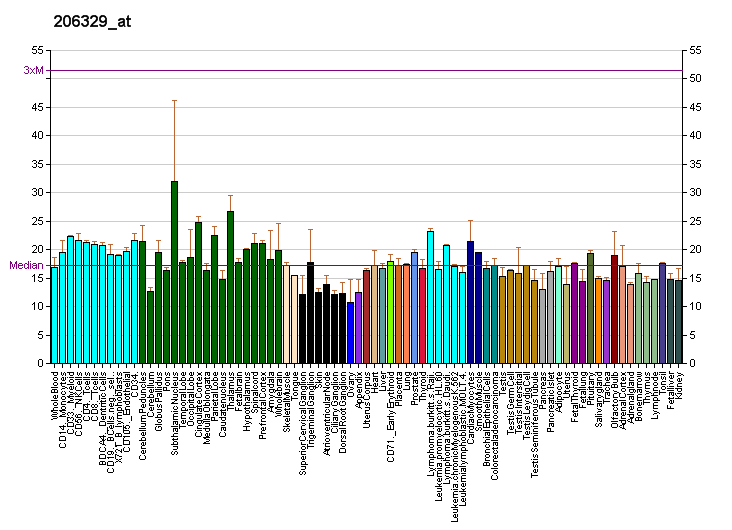
RNA expression pattern
Bgee	Human / Mouse (ortholog); Top expressed in: right frontal lobe; tibial nerve; prefrontal cortex; Brodmann area 9; cingulate gyrus; anterior cingulate cortex; amygdala; muscle of thigh; tibia; sural nerve / Top expressed in: muscle of thigh; extraocular muscle; lumbar subsegment of spinal cord; zygote; soleus muscle; visual cortex; primary visual cortex; upper arm; superior frontal gyrus; triceps brachii muscle; More reference expression data
BioGPS	More reference expression data
Gene ontology
Molecular function	transferase activity; glucuronosyl-N-acetylglucosaminyl-proteoglycan 4-alpha-N-acetylglucosaminyltransferase activity; glycosyltransferase activity
Cellular component	integral component of membrane; endoplasmic reticulum; membrane; endoplasmic reticulum membrane
Biological process	skeletal system development; protein glycosylation; IRE1-mediated unfolded protein response
Sources:Amigo / QuickGO
Orthologs
Databases	NCBI: entry; OMA: entry
Species	Human	Mouse
Entrez	2134	56219
Ensembl	ENSG00000158008	ENSMUSG00000028838
UniProt	Q92935	Q9JKV7
RefSeq (mRNA)	NM_004455	NM_019578; NM_001355493
RefSeq (protein)	NP_004446	NP_062524; NP_001342422
Location (UCSC)	Chr 1: 26.02 – 26.04 Mb	Chr 4: 134.08 – 134.11 Mb
PubMed search
- Wikidata
View/Edit Human	View/Edit Mouse

Exostosin-like 1 is a protein that in humans is encoded by the EXTL1 gene.

This gene is a member of the multiple exostoses (EXT) family of glycosyltransferases, which function in the chain polymerization of heparan sulfate and heparin. The encoded protein harbors alpha 1,4- N-acetylglucosaminyltransferase activity, and is involved in chain elongation of heparan sulfate and possibly heparin.
