= EXTL2 =

Protein-coding gene in humans

Identifiers
- Aliases: EXTL2, EXTR2, exostosin-like glycosyltransferase 2, exostosin like glycosyltransferase 2
- External IDs: OMIM: 602411; MGI: 1889574; GeneCards: EXTL2
Available structures
PDB	Ortholog search: PDBe RCSB
PDB	List of PDB id codes 1OMX, 1OMZ, 1ON6, 1ON8
Enzyme activity
EC #	BRENDA	ExPASy	KEGG	MetaCyc
2.4.1.223	↗	↗	↗	↗

Gene location (Human)
Chr.	Chromosome 1 (human)
Band	1p21.2	Start	100,872,372 bp
Band	1p21.2	End	100,895,179 bp

Gene location (Mouse)
Chr.	Chromosome 3 (mouse)
Band	3|3 G1	Start	115,801,111 bp
Band	3|3 G1	End	115,822,666 bp
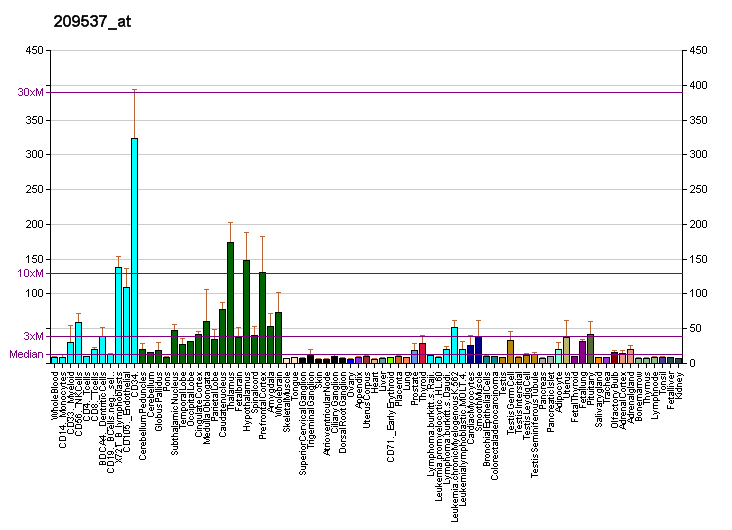
RNA expression pattern
Bgee	Human / Mouse (ortholog); Top expressed in: periodontal fiber; postcentral gyrus; Brodmann area 46; lateral nuclear group of thalamus; ventricular zone; right adrenal cortex; superior frontal gyrus; left adrenal gland; left adrenal cortex; stromal cell of endometrium / Top expressed in: facial motor nucleus; motor neuron; substantia nigra; anterior horn of spinal cord; lobe of cerebellum; cerebellar vermis; pineal gland; habenula; deep cerebellar nuclei; medial vestibular nucleus; More reference expression data
BioGPS	More reference expression data
Gene ontology
Molecular function	transferase activity; glucuronyl-galactosyl-proteoglycan 4-alpha-N-acetylglucosaminyltransferase activity; metal ion binding; glycosyltransferase activity; glycosaminoglycan binding; manganese ion binding; alpha-1,4-N-acetylgalactosaminyltransferase activity; glucuronylgalactosylproteoglycan 4-beta-N-acetylgalactosaminyltransferase activity
Cellular component	integral component of membrane; extracellular region; endoplasmic reticulum; membrane; endoplasmic reticulum membrane
Biological process	heparan sulfate proteoglycan biosynthetic process; N-acetylglucosamine metabolic process; UDP-N-acetylgalactosamine metabolic process; IRE1-mediated unfolded protein response; protein glycosylation
Sources:Amigo / QuickGO
Orthologs
Databases	NCBI: entry; OMA: entry
Species	Human	Mouse
Entrez	2135	58193
Ensembl	ENSG00000162694	ENSMUSG00000027963
UniProt	Q9UBQ6	Q9ES89
RefSeq (mRNA)	NM_001033025; NM_001261440; NM_001261441; NM_001261442; NM_001439	NM_001163514; NM_001163515; NM_021388
RefSeq (protein)	NP_001028197; NP_001248369; NP_001248370; NP_001248371; NP_001430	NP_001156986; NP_001156987; NP_067363
Location (UCSC)	Chr 1: 100.87 – 100.9 Mb	Chr 3: 115.8 – 115.82 Mb
PubMed search
- Wikidata
View/Edit Human	View/Edit Mouse

Exostosin-like 2 is a protein that in humans is encoded by the EXTL2 gene. EXTL2 Glycosyltransferase is required for the biosynthesis of heparan-sulfate and responsible for the alternating addition of beta-1-4-linked glucuronic acid (GlcA) and alpha-1-4-linked N-acetylglucosamine (GlcNAc) units to nascent heparan sulfate chains. (https://www.phosphosite.org/overviewExecuteAction?id=5020882)
