= EXT1 =

Protein-coding gene in the species Homo sapiens

Identifiers
- Aliases: EXT1, EXT, LGCR, LGS, TRPS2, TTV, exostosin glycosyltransferase 1
- External IDs: OMIM: 608177; MGI: 894663; GeneCards: EXT1
Enzyme activity
EC #	BRENDA	ExPASy	KEGG	MetaCyc
2.4.1.225	↗	↗	↗	↗

Gene location (Human)
Chr.	Chromosome 8 (human)
Band	8q24.11	Start	117,794,490 bp
Band	8q24.11	End	118,111,826 bp

Gene location (Mouse)
Chr.	Chromosome 15 (mouse)
Band	15 C|15 20.0 cM	Start	52,927,434 bp
Band	15 C|15 20.0 cM	End	53,209,555 bp
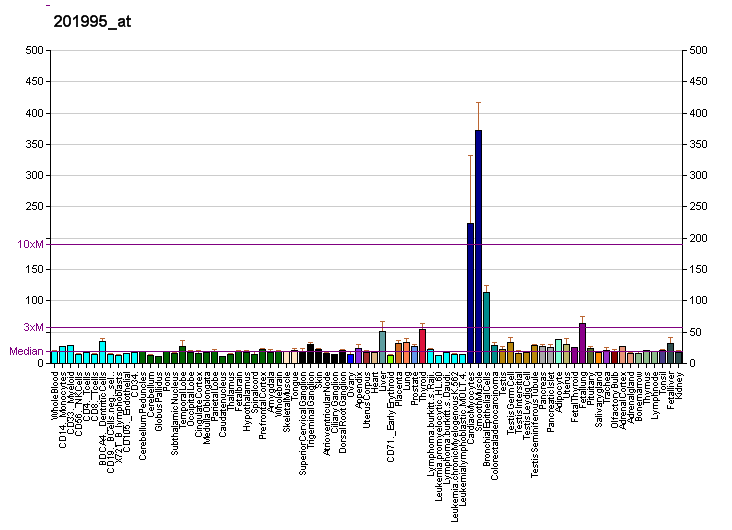

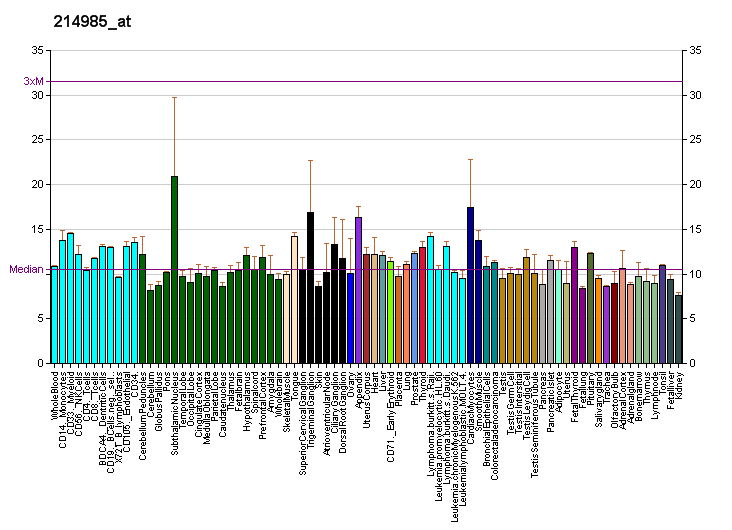
RNA expression pattern
Bgee	Human / Mouse (ortholog); Top expressed in: stromal cell of endometrium; saphenous vein; Descending thoracic aorta; ascending aorta; right coronary artery; jejunal mucosa; ventricular zone; popliteal artery; tibial arteries; duodenum / Top expressed in: tail of embryo; cumulus cell; secondary oocyte; genital tubercle; efferent ductule; external carotid artery; zygote; ascending aorta; epithelium of lens; internal carotid artery; More reference expression data
BioGPS	More reference expression data
Gene ontology
Molecular function	transferase activity; heparan sulfate N-acetylglucosaminyltransferase activity; acetylglucosaminyltransferase activity; protein homodimerization activity; glycosyltransferase activity; N-acetylglucosaminyl-proteoglycan 4-beta-glucuronosyltransferase activity; glucuronosyltransferase activity; glucuronosyl-N-acetylglucosaminyl-proteoglycan 4-alpha-N-acetylglucosaminyltransferase activity; metal ion binding; protein heterodimerization activity
Cellular component	integral component of membrane; Golgi apparatus; endoplasmic reticulum membrane; membrane; Golgi membrane; integral component of endoplasmic reticulum membrane; endoplasmic reticulum
Biological process	skeletal system development; heparan sulfate proteoglycan biosynthetic process, polysaccharide chain biosynthetic process; endoderm development; embryonic skeletal joint development; ossification; heparan sulfate proteoglycan biosynthetic process; axon guidance; protein glycosylation; brain development; gastrulation; olfactory bulb development; mesoderm development; cellular polysaccharide biosynthetic process; signal transduction; glycosaminoglycan biosynthetic process
Sources:Amigo / QuickGO
Orthologs
Databases	NCBI: entry; OMA: entry
Species	Human	Mouse
Entrez	2131	14042
Ensembl	ENSG00000182197	ENSMUSG00000061731
UniProt	Q16394	P97464
RefSeq (mRNA)	NM_000127	NM_010162
RefSeq (protein)	NP_000118	NP_034292
Location (UCSC)	Chr 8: 117.79 – 118.11 Mb	Chr 15: 52.93 – 53.21 Mb
PubMed search
- Wikidata
View/Edit Human	View/Edit Mouse

Exostosin-1 is a protein that in humans is encoded by the EXT1 gene.

This gene encodes one of the two endoplasmic reticulum-resident type II transmembrane glycosyltransferase – the other being EXT2 – which are involved in the chain elongation step of heparan sulfate biosynthesis. Mutations in this gene cause the type I form of multiple exostoses.

EXT1 is important for heparan sulfate biosynthesis; however, studies involving EXT1-deficient cell lines suggest that there is limited production of HS even in the absence of EXT1. These cells produced shorter HS chains than those with functional EXT1. The residual synthesis in EXT1-deficient cells occurred due to EXT2 or EXTL2 (EXT-like) enzymes, which proves their significant role in HS biosynthesis.

== Interactions ==
EXT1 has been shown to interact with TRAP1.

== See also ==
- Langer–Giedion syndrome
- Hereditary multiple exostoses type 1
