= EXT2 (gene) =

Protein-coding gene in the species Homo sapiens

Identifiers
- Aliases: EXT2, SOTV, SSMS, exostosin glycosyltransferase 2
- External IDs: OMIM: 608210; MGI: 108050; GeneCards: EXT2
Enzyme activity
EC #	BRENDA	ExPASy	KEGG	MetaCyc
2.4.1.224	↗	↗	↗	↗

Gene location (Human)
Chr.	Chromosome 11 (human)
Band	11p11.2	Start	44,095,648 bp
Band	11p11.2	End	44,251,962 bp

Gene location (Mouse)
Chr.	Chromosome 2 (mouse)
Band	2 E1|2 51.62 cM	Start	93,491,373 bp
Band	2 E1|2 51.62 cM	End	93,652,913 bp
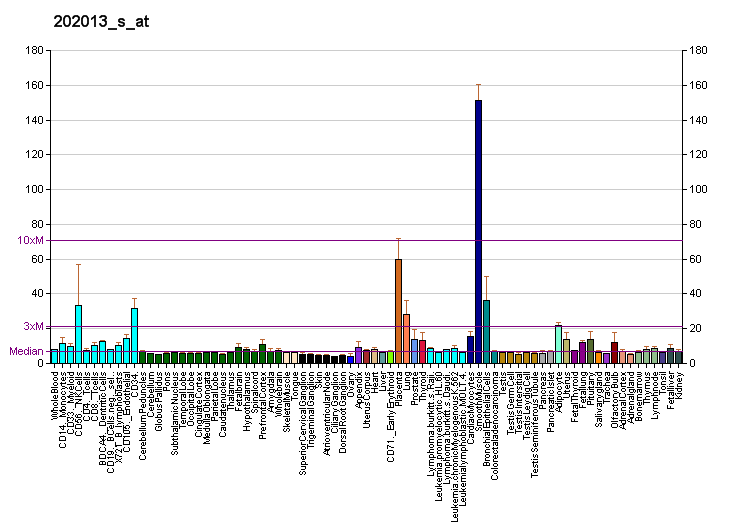

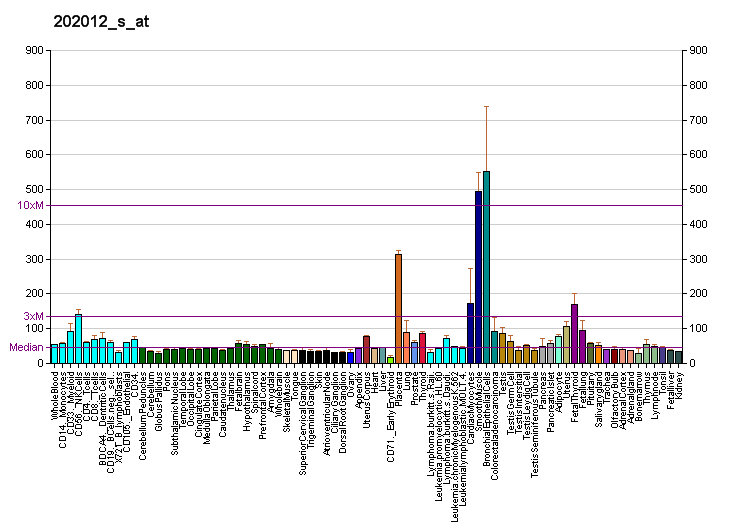
RNA expression pattern
Bgee	Human / Mouse (ortholog); Top expressed in: stromal cell of endometrium; cartilage tissue; smooth muscle tissue; tibia; islet of Langerhans; body of uterus; thoracic aorta; right coronary artery; ascending aorta; Descending thoracic aorta / Top expressed in: tail of embryo; calvaria; yolk sac; vestibular sensory epithelium; decidua; genital tubercle; ankle; right kidney; gastrula; molar; More reference expression data
BioGPS	More reference expression data
Gene ontology
Molecular function	transferase activity; heparan sulfate N-acetylglucosaminyltransferase activity; acetylglucosaminyltransferase activity; protein homodimerization activity; glycosyltransferase activity; N-acetylglucosaminyl-proteoglycan 4-beta-glucuronosyltransferase activity; glucuronosyltransferase activity; glucuronosyl-N-acetylglucosaminyl-proteoglycan 4-alpha-N-acetylglucosaminyltransferase activity; metal ion binding; protein heterodimerization activity; protein binding
Cellular component	integral component of membrane; endoplasmic reticulum membrane; membrane; Golgi membrane; UDP-N-acetylglucosamine transferase complex; endoplasmic reticulum; extracellular exosome; Golgi apparatus
Biological process	heparan sulfate proteoglycan biosynthetic process, polysaccharide chain biosynthetic process; cell differentiation; ossification; mesoderm formation; heparan sulfate proteoglycan biosynthetic process; protein glycosylation; glycosaminoglycan biosynthetic process; cellular polysaccharide biosynthetic process; signal transduction
Sources:Amigo / QuickGO
Orthologs
Databases	NCBI: entry; OMA: entry
Species	Human	Mouse
Entrez	2132	14043
Ensembl	ENSG00000151348	ENSMUSG00000027198
UniProt	Q93063	P70428
RefSeq (mRNA)	NM_000401; NM_001178083; NM_207122; NM_001389628; NM_001389630	NM_010163; NM_001355075; NM_001355076
RefSeq (protein)	NP_000392; NP_001171554; NP_997005	NP_034293; NP_001342004; NP_001342005
Location (UCSC)	Chr 11: 44.1 – 44.25 Mb	Chr 2: 93.49 – 93.65 Mb
PubMed search
- Wikidata
View/Edit Human	View/Edit Mouse

Exostosin glycosyltransferase-2 is a protein that in humans is encoded by the EXT2 gene.

This gene encodes one of two glycosyltransferases involved in the chain elongation step of heparan sulfate biosynthesis. Mutations in this gene cause the type II form of Hereditary Multiple Exostoses (HME).

== Gene ==
The EXT2 gene is located on chromosome 11 in the human genome, its location is on the p arm of this chromosome. The p arm of a chromosome is the shorter arm of a chromosome.

== Species distribution ==
This gene was found to be present in many species other than humans such as mice, chickens, dogs, cows and many more. Other orthologs have been found including Drosophila melanogaster and Caenorhabditis elegans.

== Interactions ==
Included in the EXT family are EXT2, EXT1, EXTL1, EXTL2, and EXTL3. The proteins formed by these genes work together to form and extend heparan sulfate chains. Heparan sulfate chains are proteoglycans present in the extracellular matrix of most tissue types. There is a lot about its function that is not entirely understood, however it is known that they have an important role for bone and cartilage formation. Cartilage is located at the growth plates of long bones and is placed in a specific pattern before it is later ossified into bone when it grows further away from the growth plate. New cartilage in a growing bone is placed through signaling proteins which bind to the heparan sulfate chains. EXT2 (protein) has also been shown to interact with TRAP1, a heat shock protein. Heat shock proteins will bind to specific proteins to help them keep their shape when the cell is stressed. TRAP1 has been found to bind to a region (in the c-terminal end) of EXT1 and EXT2 proteins to help it keep its desired shape and function.

== Clinical significance ==
=== Mutations ===
Mutations that change the amino acid sequence of the exostosin glycosyltransferase-2 protein can lead to it becoming unfunctional. When this protein is unfunctional it causes the heparan sulfate chains to become shorter. The chains are still formed and extended by the other proteins encoded by the EXT family genes, although not to the same extent. This increases the likelihood that a cartilage cell will be placed incorrectly, as heparan sulfate is a bone and cartilage tumor suppressor. Since bone has a very specific structure, misplacing a cartilage cell in early growth is comparable to misplacement of a brick early on in construction of a wall. Misplacement in cartilage will result in cartilage tumor or tumors at the growth plates of long bones. This condition is known as hereditary multiple exostoses (HME) or hereditary multiple osteochondromas (HMO). HME can also be the result of a mutation to the EXT1 gene or other EXT family genes. EXT1 mutations tend to be more severe with more exostoses and are the cause of 56-78% of human HME cases, except for in China where mutations of the EXT2 gene are more common. HME effects 1 in 50,000 people and is more commonly seen in males in a 1.5:1 ratio.

=== Heredity ===
EXT2 gene mutations are dominant autosomal (not sex-linked) and is lethal in the homozygous form. This means that if the mutated gene is inherited from both parents giving the offspring two copies of the mutated gene (the homozygous form of the mutant gene) this will result in early embryonic death in the gastrula stage of development. Reasons for why this happens is that heparan sulfate has more roles than just bone formation, it also plays a role in embryonic development. Heparan sulfate can bind signaling molecules used in development such as transforming growth factor β, Fgf proteins and Wnt proteins. The only individuals with this mutation exist in the heterozygous form, this means that they have one EXT2 gene that is normal and one that is mutated. For the inheritance of this gene mutation, for a mutated parent and a not mutated parent there is a 50% chance that the offspring will also have an EXT2 mutation. For two parents with the EXT2 mutation, of their living offspring 2 out of 3 will have the mutation.
