= A-1,6-mannosyl-glycoprotein 2-b-N-acetylglucosaminyltransferase =

Class of enzymes

Alpha-1,6-mannosyl-glycoprotein 2-beta-N-acetylglucosaminyltransferase

Identifiers
- EC no.: 2.4.1.143
- CAS no.: 105913-04-0

Databases
- IntEnz: IntEnz view
- BRENDA: BRENDA entry
- ExPASy: NiceZyme view
- KEGG: KEGG entry
- MetaCyc: metabolic pathway
- PRIAM: profile
- PDB structures: RCSB PDB PDBe PDBsum
Search
- PMC: articles
- PubMed: articles
- NCBI: proteins

Alpha-1,6-mannosyl-glycoprotein 2-beta-N-acetylglucosaminyltransferase (EC 2.4.1.143, N-acetylglucosaminyltransferase II, N-glycosyl-oligosaccharide-glycoprotein N-acetylglucosaminyltransferase II, acetylglucosaminyltransferase II, uridine diphosphoacetylglucosamine-mannoside alpha1->6-acetylglucosaminyltransferase, uridine diphosphoacetylglucosamine-alpha-1,6-mannosylglycoprotein beta-1-2-N-acetylglucosaminyltransferase, uridine diphosphoacetylglucosamine-alpha-D-mannoside beta1-2-acetylglucosaminyltransferase, UDP-GlcNAc:mannoside alpha1-6 acetylglucosaminyltransferase, alpha-1,6-mannosyl-glycoprotein beta-1,2-N-acetylglucosaminyltransferase, GnTII) is an enzyme with systematic name UDP-N-acetyl-D-glucosamine:6-(alpha-D-mannosyl)-beta-D-mannosyl-glycoprotein 2-beta-N-acetyl-D-glucosaminyltransferase. This enzyme catalyses the following chemical reaction

UDP-N-acetyl-D-glucosamine + 6-(alpha-D-mannosyl)-beta-D-mannosyl-R $\rightleftharpoons$ UDP + 6-(2-[N-acetyl-beta-D-glucosaminyl]-alpha-D-mannosyl)-beta-D-mannosyl-R

R represents the remainder of the N-linked oligosaccharide in the glycoprotein acceptor.
