= Ultrasonic vocalization =

Vocalizations too high for human hearing

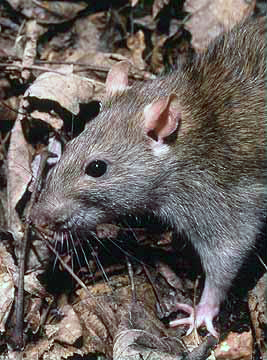
Common rat

Ultrasonic vocalizations (USVs) occur at frequencies ranging from approximately 20–100 kHz. They are emitted by animals such as bats and rodents, and have been extensively studied in rats and mice. As opposed to sonic vocalizations, ultrasonic vocalizations cannot be detected by the human ear. USVs serve as social signals, and are categorized according to their frequency. Different categories of USVs are elicited in response to different situations and varying affective states. The behavioural functions of USVs vary as a rat or mouse pup reaches the juvenile/adult stage of their development. The brain mechanisms behind calling behaviour have also been studied, and some studies have used pharmacological manipulation.

== History ==
John W. Anderson, a professor in the Department of Zoology at Cornell University, was the first to discover that rats were capable of emitting ultrasonic vocalizations. He used a sonic amplifier to observe these vocalizations, and could not be sure of their function. However, he hypothesized that these vocalizations could help rats to communicate amongst themselves and/or orient themselves in their environment, similar to bat echolocation. This hypothesis was put to the test a number of times, but it did not hold up in experimental testing. There were several studies supporting the fact that rats use echolocation, but ultrasonic vocalizations were not involved. Other studies have proposed that ultrasonic vocalizations are by-products of a rat’s physiological response to temperature (for example, helping to return venous blood to the rat’s heart). However, it has now been widely accepted that rats emit ultrasonic vocalizations as social signals. Ultrasonic vocalizations are not exclusive to rats. Other rodents such as mice emit such vocalizations, as well as bats.

== Classification ==
The ultrasonic vocalizations emitted by rats and mice have been categorized. There are three classifications: 22-kHz vocalizations, 40-kHz vocalizations, and 50-kHz vocalizations. The 40-kHz calls are short in duration, lasting anywhere from 80-150 milliseconds, while the 50-kHz calls tend to be even shorter, lasting anywhere from 20-100 milliseconds. In contrast, the 22-kHz calls are longer in duration, ranging from 300-3000 milliseconds. Adults emit the 22-kHz and 50-kHz vocalizations, while pups emit 40-kHz vocalizations. Ultrasonic vocalizations are not precisely 22-, 40- and 50-kHz. 22-kHz calls can range from 18-32-kHz, 40-kHz calls range from 40-70-kHz, and 50-kHz calls range from 35-72-kHz.

The 22-kHz vocalizations of adults and the 40-kHz vocalizations of pups are emitted in response to aversive situations or noxious stimuli. For example, isolation, aggression between males, appearance of predators, surprising noises and inescapable foot shocks would elicit these vocalizations. Conversely, the 50-kHz vocalizations emitted by adults are produced during appetitive situations such as social play between juveniles, whilst engaging in mating behaviour, or when the animal is touched gently. Individual differences, as well as social factors such as housing arrangements, can affect the number of elicited vocalizations and the probability of their occurrence. However, variability is wider in 22- and 50-kHz calls, and lower in 40-kHz calls. Whereas 40-kHz calls have a high survival value for pups, 22- and 50-kHz calls are emitted in situations that can differ greatly between individuals.

== Vocalizations and behaviour ==
The literature primarily examines the relationship between ultrasonic vocalizations and rodent behaviour. The 40-kHz call of a pup is an important to its survival. If pups are left behind and they emit a 40-kHz call, this will induce retrieval behavior in the mother. When one pup is separated from their littermates, they will produce ultrasonic vocalizations at high rates. Compounds including benzodiazepines, which are positive modulators of GABA receptors, will decrease the production of ultrasonic vocalizations which are emitted in response to social isolation. During emission of 22-kHz calls, juveniles and adults are often exhibiting freezing behaviour and experiencing an increase in heart rate and blood pressure. Since 22-kHz calls are emitted in response to unpleasant situations and noxious stimuli, it has been thought that these calls serve two functions: reflecting anxiety, and communication. With respect to communication, these calls could be emitted as threat signalling to conspecifics or individuals of other species to decrease the probability of an aggressive encounter, or they could be emitted as alarm calling to warn other individuals in the population of imminent danger. 50-kHz calls may promote social interaction among conspecifics by inducing and maintaining them. They are thought to be indicative of positive affective states. These 50-kHz calls are also emitted in anticipation of a rewarding stimulus.

== Physiology and pharmacology ==
The larynx has been implicated in the production of ultrasonic vocalizations. A constriction within a rat’s larynx is thought to be the source of their ultrasonic vocalizations. As well, brain areas such as the medulla oblongata, the cortex, the amygdala, and the dorsal hippocampus, among others, play a role in 22-kHz calls specifically. Many of these brain areas/structures have been implicated in studies involving fear and anxiety, and can be associated with a larger network which deals with aversive emotions.

Twenty-two-kHz calls have been studied in pharmacology. The possible ways in which drugs affect 22-kHz vocalizations has been an area of particular interest, and it has been shown that administering certain benzodiazepines can lead to a reduction in calling behaviour, while certain antidepressants, dopamine reuptake inhibitors, and antipsychotics did not have nearly the same inhibitory effect.
