= Gordon Dixon (biochemist) =

Gordon Henry Dixon, OC FRSC FRS (25 March 1930 – July 24, 2016) was a Canadian biochemist, and professor at the University of Toronto and the University of Calgary. He won the 1980 Flavelle Medal. He was elected Fellow of the Royal Society of Canada in 1970, and of the Royal Society of London in 1978.

He was born in Durban, South Africa. He lived in Victoria, British Columbia, where he died on July 24, 2016.
