= EHD3 =

Protein-coding gene in the species Homo sapiens

Identifiers
- Aliases: EHD3, PAST3, EH domain containing 3
- External IDs: OMIM: 605891; MGI: 1928900; GeneCards: EHD3

Gene location (Human)
| Chr. | Chromosome 2 (human) |
| Band | 2p23.1 | Start | 31,234,152 bp |
| Band | 2p23.1 | End | 31,269,451 bp |

Gene location (Mouse)
| Chr. | Chromosome 17 (mouse) |
| Band | 17 E2|17 45.2 cM | Start | 74,111,129 bp |
| Band | 17 E2|17 45.2 cM | End | 74,139,089 bp |
RNA expression pattern
| Bgee | Human / Mouse (ortholog); Top expressed in: lateral nuclear group of thalamus; postcentral gyrus; orbitofrontal cortex; superior frontal gyrus; cerebellar vermis; spinal ganglia; middle temporal gyrus; Brodmann area 46; Brodmann area 23; entorhinal cortex / Top expressed in: gastrula; stria vascularis; vestibular sensory epithelium; dentate gyrus of hippocampal formation granule cell; anterior horn of spinal cord; facial motor nucleus; vestibular membrane of cochlear duct; hippocampus proper; utricle; adrenal gland; More reference expression data |
| BioGPS | n/a |
Gene ontology
| Molecular function | nucleotide binding; calcium ion binding; GTP binding; metal ion binding; protein binding; nucleic acid binding; ATP binding |
| Cellular component | cytoplasm; endosome; cell projection; membrane; focal adhesion; myelin sheath; endocytic vesicle; plasma membrane; cilium; recycling endosome membrane; ciliary membrane; ciliary pocket membrane; perinuclear region of cytoplasm; endosome membrane; nucleus; cytosol |
| Biological process | blood coagulation; cell projection organization; regulation of cardiac muscle cell membrane potential; protein homooligomerization; regulation of Golgi organization; regulation of cardiac conduction; receptor recycling; protein transport; Golgi to lysosome transport; regulation of cardiac muscle contraction; positive regulation of voltage-gated calcium channel activity; early endosome to Golgi transport; endocytic recycling; cilium assembly; transport; protein localization to plasma membrane |
Sources:Amigo / QuickGO
Orthologs
| Databases | NCBI: entry; OMA: entry |
| Species | Human | Mouse |
| Entrez | 30845 | 57440 |
| Ensembl | ENSG00000013016 | ENSMUSG00000024065 |
| UniProt | Q9NZN3 | Q9QXY6 |
| RefSeq (mRNA) | NM_014600 | NM_020578 |
| RefSeq (protein) | NP_055415 | NP_065603 |
| Location (UCSC) | Chr 2: 31.23 – 31.27 Mb | Chr 17: 74.11 – 74.14 Mb |
| PubMed search |
- Wikidata
| View/Edit Human | View/Edit Mouse |

Eps15 homology domain-containing protein 3, abbreviated as EHD3 and also known as PAST3, is a protein encoded by the EHD3 gene. It has been observed in humans, mice and rats. It belongs to the EHD protein family, a group of four membrane remodeling proteins related to the Dynamin superfamily of large GTPases. Although the four of them are 70-80% amino acid identical, they all have different locations. Its main function is related to endocytic transport.

| Length (aa) | 535 |
| Molecular mass (kDa) | 60.887 |
| Molecular weight (g/mol) | 60,887.13 |
| Charge | 0.0 |
| Isoelectric point | 6.5173 |
| Exon count | 7 |
| Orthologs | Mice and rats |

== Structure ==
=== Primary structure ===
The primary structure of a protein is related to which amino acids a protein is made of. EHD3 has 535 amino acids, of which almost three-quarters are common in the four EHD proteins. This protein has a molecular mass of 60887 daltons.

=== Secondary structure ===
The secondary structure of the EHD3 protein still remains unknown.

=== Tertiary structure ===
The tertiary structure of a protein involves the domains it is formed of. EHD3 protein is formed of four different domains:

- EH domain-containing protein N-terminal, between the 24th and 56th amino acid. This is a short domain that can be found at the beginning of a protein, also known as N-terminus, of many dynamins and EF-hand domain-containing proteins.
- Dynamin-type guanine nucleotide-binding (G) domain, between the 56th and 286th amino acid. It consists of a central eight-stranded beta-sheet surrounded by seven alpha helices and two one-turn helices. It is involved in the binding of magnesium ions (Mg^{2+}) and GTP hydrolysis. GTP is joined to the protein through a nucleotide binding region, located between the 65th and 72nd amino acid.
- EH domain, between the 444th and 532nd amino acid. It is found in all of the EHD proteins. The fold consists of two helix-loop-helix connected by a short antiparallel beta-sheet. The target peptide is bound in a hydrophobic region between two alpha helices. Apart from an EF-hand domain, it can also include tyrosine phosphorylation sites and coiled coils. This domain is often related to the regulation of protein transport, sorting and membrane trafficking.
- EF-hand, between the 476th and 511th amino acid. It forms part of the EH domain. It has a calcium ion (Ca^{2+}) binding, between the 489th and 500th amino acid, which interacts selectively and non-covalently with calcium ions, attaching them to the protein.

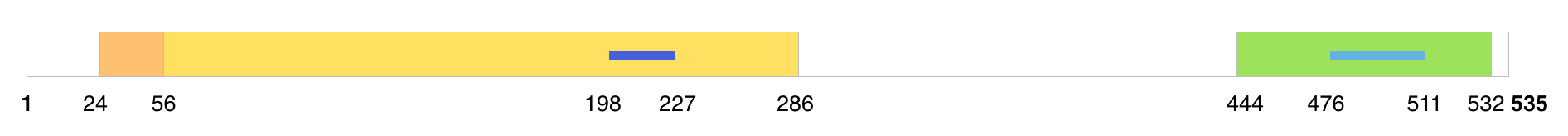
Domains of the EHD3 protein. In orange, the EH domain-containing protein N-terminal. In yellow, the dynamin-type G domain. In navy blue, the coiled-coil domain. In green, the ED domain. And in blue, the EF-hand domain.

=== Post-translational modifications ===
Protein post-translational modifications (PTM) increase the functional diversity of the proteome by the covalent addition of functional groups or proteins, by the hydrolysis of peptide bonds that link amino acids together or by the degradation of different parts of the protein. The EHD3 protein suffers three kinds of amino acid modifications:

- Acetylation. It consists of attaching an acetyl group at the N-terminus. Therefore, the first amino acid is an N-acetylmethionine.
- Cross-link. It involves linking two proteins or two parts of the same protein with covalent bonds. In the case of EHD3, there are two cross-links which are isopeptide bonds between a lysine and a glycine. They are located in the 315th and 511th amino acid.
- Phosphorylation. It consists of the addition of a phosphate group (HPO_{3}). In EHD3, there are two serine phosphorylations; one in the 349th amino acid and other in the 456th.

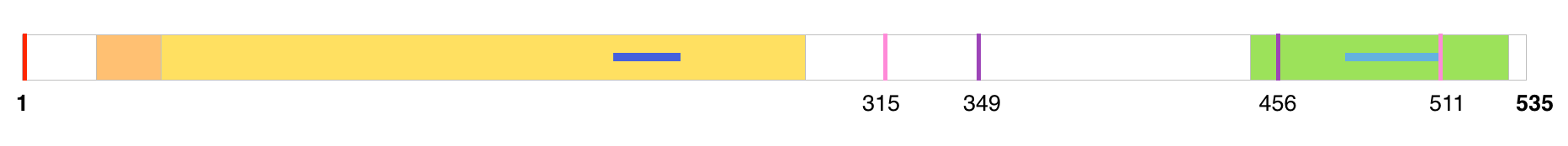
Post-translational modifications of the EHD3. In red, acetylations. In pink, cross-links. And in purple, phosphorylations.

== Functions ==
The EH domain is a common motif in a family of proteins involved in endocytic trafficking. This family of four paralogs (EHD1-EHD4) has been implicated in receptor intracellular trafficking, particularly in internalization and recycling to the plasma membrane. The list of functions of EHD proteins is just starting to be populated.

EHD3 is a moonlighting protein, which means it can perform different functions depending on the tissue where the protein is located. The main functions are the following:

- To take part in endocytic transport. The EHD-family proteins have been seen to have a direct relation with endocytic transport in the cell. EHD1 (the closest paralog of EHD3) is in charge of enabling membrane recycling by controlling the way out of internalized molecules from the ERC to the plasma membrane. It has also been found that these EHD proteins bind to the Rab11-effector Rab11-FIP2 via EH-NPF interactions. These associations are affected by their ability to bind nucleotides. The role of EHD1 bonded to the Rab11-effector is clear (stated above), while there has not been found a clear relation between EHD3 and Rab11-FIP2. But when the EHD3 protein underwent a knockdown, the delivery of internalized transferrin and early endosomal proteins to the ERC was prevented, and even the subcellular location of Rab11-FIP2 changed. Therefore, a coordinated role for EHD proteins and Rab11-FIP2 has been found in mediating endocytic recycling and concretely for EHD3, early endosome to ERC transport.
- To control the membrane reorganization upon ATP hydrolysis.
- To induce phosphatidic acid membrane tubulation activity.
- To recycle the D1 dopamine receptor.

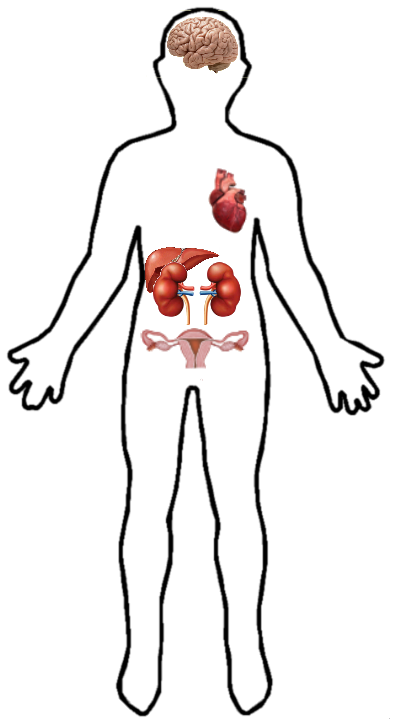
EHD3 can be mainly found in human heart and brain, as well as kidney, ovary and liver.

== Gene ==
The gene that encodes the human EHD3 protein is located in chromosome number 2, most specifically in the 23.1 region. On the other hand, the murine EHD3 gene is located in chromosome 17, in the 21st region. The human gene is formed approximately of 35,438 bases.

Both the human and the mouse genes contain a polymorphic (CA) repeat in their 3'UTR. Specifically, human tissue presents two, 4.2- and 3.6-kb, EHD3 RNA species. While the gene is highly expressed in heart and brain, it is moderately expressed in kidney, ovary, liver and placenta.

== Location ==
EHD3 protein has been found in humans and mice. It can be mainly found in human heart and brain, as well as kidney, ovary and liver.

EHD3 (expressed as a green fluorescent fusion protein) was localized in endocytic vesicles, mostly in recycling vesicles, and in membrane tubules, which implicates the N-terminal domain. Therefore, is not rare that this protein regulates the microtubule-dependent movement.

== Pathology ==
=== Mutagenesis ===
- Mutation in the position 65 (G → R): It is a change between a glycine and an arginine. Whereas between the 65th and the 72nd amino acid is located a nucleotide binding, a mutation in the first amino acid abolishes the ATP-binding
- Mutation in the position 203 (V → P): A valine is substituted by a proline. It is located in the coiled coil of the dynamin-type guanine nucleotide-binding domain. It reduces oligomerization and interaction with Rab11-FIP2, a protein which regulates the transport of vesicles from the endosomal recycling compartment (ERC) to the plasma membrane.
- Mutation in the position 315 (K → R): An arginine replaces a lysine. It abolishes the function of the cross-link, which is located in the same amino acid. Therefore, the protein can not sumoylate the R-511. Furthermore, it affects its localization in the tubular structures of the ERC.
- Mutation in the position 485 (W → A): A tryptophan is changed by an alanine. Although it is not a coiled coil, it also abolishes interaction with Rab11-FIP2, just like the mutation in the position 203.
- Mutation in the position 511 (K → R): in the same way as the mutation in the position 315, a lysine is substituted by an arginine and the cross-link is unable to do sumoylation. However, this cross-link is associated with R-315, instead of the R-511.

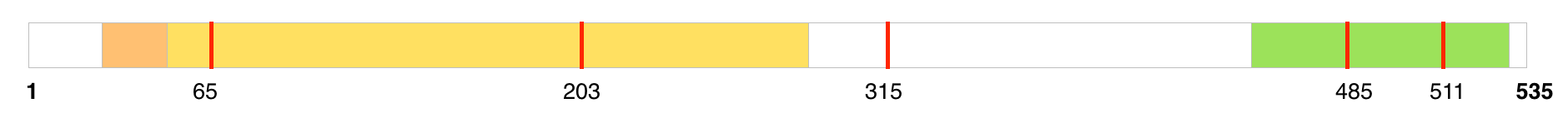
EHD3 principal mutations.

=== Diseases ===
The lack or malfunction of this protein in the human body can cause some diseases such as heart failure or a depressive disorder. Losing EHD3 is also known to be an early step towards glioma formation.

==== Major Depressive Disorder (MDD) ====
Women are more propense to depressive disorders and anxiety than men, although the reason is still unknown. Still, recent studies have shown the direct relation of some genes and their encoded proteins with the disease, including EHD3. Three SNPs have been found in the gene that are concretely linked to MDD and anxious behaviour exclusively in female patients, which suggest a gender differentiating role in MDD.

==== EHD3 in glioma formation ====
Since EHD3 is most abundantly expressed in brain tissues, its role in brain cancer progression has been investigated.

EHD3 gene has functions as a tumor suppressor gene and the loss of its expression is a very common event in gliomas. The loss of EHD3 transcripts is observed even in the least advanced grades, I and II, suggesting that EHD3 loss is an early event during gliomagenesis. Moreover, EHD3 has growth inhibitory functions and induces a G_{0}/G_{1} cell cycle arrest and apoptotic death. It is possible that the proapoptotic role of EHD3 involves functions not related to its role in trafficking, but rather to its ATP/GTP-binding ability and possible impact on protein kinase signaling.
