= IDT =

IDT may refer to:

== Technology ==
- Information and digital technology, a digitally focused information technology landscape
- Interdigital transducer, or interdigitated transducer, a sensor and transmitter for a surface acoustic wave
- Interrupt descriptor table, a memory structure of x86 microprocessors
- Insulation-displacement technology, or insulation-displacement termination, an electrical connector
- Interactive data transformation, a form of data transformation via a visual interface intended for analysts and business users with limited technical knowledge

== Organisations ==
- IDT Corporation, a long-distance telephone carrier
- Integrated Device Technology, a semiconductor manufacturer
- Integrated Display Technology, a Hong Kong-based producer of LCD products
- Integrated DNA Technologies, a U.S. supplier of custom nucleic acids
- International Display Technology, a joint-venture of IBM and the Taiwanese Chi Mei group
- IDT Entertainment, film producer

== Other ==
- Inherited disorders of trafficking
- Israel Daylight Time
- It Dies Today, a metalcore band from Buffalo, New York
- Inactive Duty Training, U.S. military duty, for example in the Inactive National Guard
