= Syntaxin 3 =

Protein-coding gene in the species Homo sapiens

STX3

Identifiers
- Aliases: STX3, STX3A, Syntaxin 3, MVID2, RDMVID, DIAR12
- External IDs: OMIM: 600876; MGI: 103077; GeneCards: STX3

Gene location (Human)
Chr.	Chromosome 11 (human)
Band	11q12.1	Start	59,713,456 bp
Band	11q12.1	End	59,805,882 bp

Gene location (Mouse)
Chr.	Chromosome 19 (mouse)
Band	19|19 A	Start	11,752,482 bp
Band	19|19 A	End	11,796,767 bp
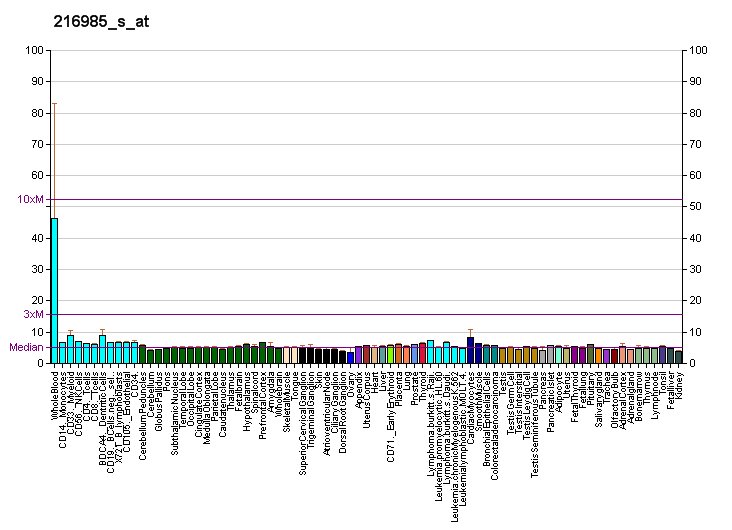

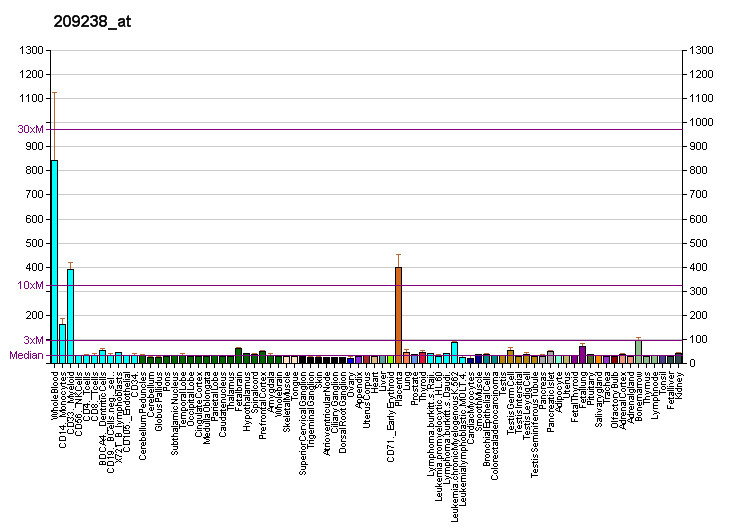
RNA expression pattern
Bgee	Human / Mouse (ortholog); Top expressed in: rectum; right lung; blood; islet of Langerhans; upper lobe of left lung; duodenum; gallbladder; jejunal mucosa; mucosa of colon; secondary oocyte / Top expressed in: neural layer of retina; retinal pigment epithelium; ciliary body; medullary collecting duct; epithelium of small intestine; primitive streak; pineal gland; iris; intestinal villus; ileum; More reference expression data
BioGPS	More reference expression data
Gene ontology
Molecular function	SNAP receptor activity; protein binding; arachidonic acid binding; SNARE binding
Cellular component	integral component of membrane; membrane; cell-cell junction; growth cone; secretory granule; vacuole; dendrite; SNARE complex; azurophil granule; specific granule; apical plasma membrane; neuron projection; extracellular exosome; lamellipodium; photoreceptor cell terminal bouton; ribbon synapse; synaptic vesicle; presynaptic membrane; melanosome; zymogen granule membrane; plasma membrane; postsynapse; endomembrane system; presynaptic active zone membrane; Schaffer collateral - CA1 synapse; glutamatergic synapse
Biological process	synaptic vesicle docking; synaptic vesicle fusion to presynaptic active zone membrane; membrane fusion; vesicle docking; positive regulation of protein localization to plasma membrane; positive regulation of chemotaxis; positive regulation of cell population proliferation; positive regulation of protein localization to cell surface; intracellular protein transport; neurotransmitter transport; neuron projection development; vesicle-mediated transport; positive regulation of cell adhesion; long-term potentiation; exocytosis; vesicle fusion; exocytic insertion of neurotransmitter receptor to postsynaptic membrane; transport; cytokine-mediated signaling pathway; vesicle-mediated transport in synapse
Sources:Amigo / QuickGO
Orthologs
Databases	NCBI: entry; OMA: entry
Species	Human	Mouse
Entrez	6809	20908
Ensembl	ENSG00000166900	ENSMUSG00000041488
UniProt	Q13277	Q64704
RefSeq (mRNA)	NM_001178040; NM_004177	NM_001025307; NM_001025308; NM_001286543; NM_011502; NM_152220 NM_001360386
RefSeq (protein)	NP_001171511; NP_004168	NP_001020478; NP_001273472; NP_035632; NP_689344; NP_001347315
Location (UCSC)	Chr 11: 59.71 – 59.81 Mb	Chr 19: 11.75 – 11.8 Mb
PubMed search
- Wikidata
View/Edit Human	View/Edit Mouse

Syntaxin 3, also known as STX3, is a protein which in humans is encoded by the STX3 gene.

== Function ==
The protein encoded by this gene is a member of the syntaxin family of cellular receptors for transport vesicles which participate in exocytosis in neutrophils. STX3 has an important role in the growth of neurites and serves as a direct target for omega-6 arachidonic acid. Mutations in Syntaxin 3 cause Microvillus inclusion disease.

== Interactions ==
Syntaxin 3 has been shown to interact with SNAP-25, SNAP23 and SNAP29.
