= Inherited disorders of trafficking =

Inherited disorders of trafficking (IDT) are a family of disorders that involve vesicular delivery of proteins. They were characterized in 1975.

CEDNIK syndrome (Cerebral Dysgenesis, Neuropathy, Ichthyosis and Keratoderma Syndrome) is a rare inherited genetic skin condition (Genodermatosis) which has been associated with a loss-of-function mutation in SNAP29; SNAP29 is a member of the SNAP Receptor (SNARE) protein family. SNARE proteins assist with vesicle trafficking and are responsible for the fusion events between the membranes of vesicles and the membranes of their targets. There are two types of SNARE proteins, v-SNARE's which are located on vesicle membranes, and t-SNARE's that are located on target membranes. SNAP29 is a t-SNARE, and as a t-SNARE, this protein must form a complex with v-SNARE's for fusion of vesicles and secretion of their load to occur. A mutation/deficiency in this protein which occurs in patients with CEDNIK syndrome results in an impaired maturation and secretion of lamellar granules—these are vesicular structures derived from the Golgi. SNAP29 is necessary for proper epidermal differentiation. Mutations in SNAP29 result in problems with molecular trafficking and transport, and leads to CEDNIK syndrome.
