= MYO5B =

Protein-coding gene in the species Homo sapiens

Identifiers
- Aliases: MYO5B, myosin VB, MVID1, DIAR2, PFIC10
- External IDs: OMIM: 606540; MGI: 106598; GeneCards: MYO5B
Available structures
PDB	Ortholog search: PDBe RCSB
PDB	List of PDB id codes 4J5M, 4LNZ, 4LWZ, 4LX0

Gene location (Human)
Chr.	Chromosome 18 (human)
Band	18q21.1	Start	49,822,789 bp
Band	18q21.1	End	50,195,147 bp

Gene location (Mouse)
Chr.	Chromosome 18 (mouse)
Band	18 E2|18 50.7 cM	Start	74,574,007 bp
Band	18 E2|18 50.7 cM	End	74,904,564 bp
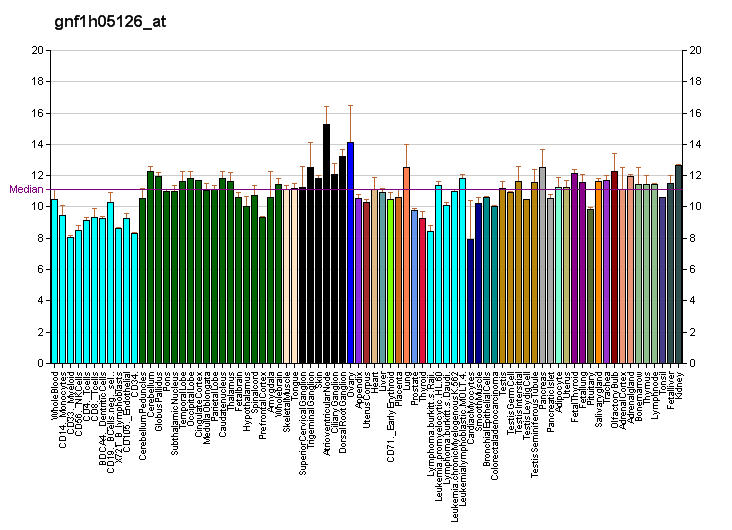
RNA expression pattern
Bgee	Human / Mouse (ortholog); Top expressed in: mucosa of ileum; jejunal mucosa; pancreatic ductal cell; rectum; mucosa of transverse colon; duodenum; islet of Langerhans; mucosa of sigmoid colon; nasal epithelium; palpebral conjunctiva / Top expressed in: primary oocyte; dentate gyrus of hippocampal formation granule cell; zygote; secondary oocyte; jejunum; ileum; epithelium of lens; intestinal epithelium; epithelium of small intestine; transitional epithelium of urinary bladder; More reference expression data
BioGPS	More reference expression data
Gene ontology
Molecular function	nucleotide binding; calmodulin binding; microfilament motor activity; protein binding; actin binding; cytoskeletal motor activity; ATP binding; actin filament binding
Cellular component	cytoplasm; recycling endosome; apical cortex; extracellular exosome; cytoplasmic vesicle membrane; myosin complex; protein-containing complex
Biological process	renal water homeostasis; protein transport; vesicle-mediated transport; transport; endosomal transport
Sources:Amigo / QuickGO
Orthologs
Databases	NCBI: entry; OMA: entry
Species	Human	Mouse
Entrez	4645	17919
Ensembl	ENSG00000167306	ENSMUSG00000025885
UniProt	Q9ULV0	P21271
RefSeq (mRNA)	NM_001080467	NM_008661; NM_201600
RefSeq (protein)	NP_001073936	n/a
Location (UCSC)	Chr 18: 49.82 – 50.2 Mb	Chr 18: 74.57 – 74.9 Mb
PubMed search
- Wikidata
View/Edit Human	View/Edit Mouse

Myosin-Vb, a myosin V type protein, is encoded by the MYO5B gene in humans.

Recent evidence suggests that Myosin-Vb is related to the creation of memories by actin-dependent trafficking of AMPA receptor containing recycling endosomes in dendritic spines.

Mutations of MYO5B cause microvillus inclusion disease due to defective trafficking of apical and basolateral proteins.

MYO5B has also been associated with bipolar disorder.

== Interactions ==
MYO5B has been shown to interact with RAB11FIP2.
