= EHD2 =

Protein-coding gene in the species Homo sapiens

Identifiers
- Aliases: EHD2, PAST2, EH domain containing 2
- External IDs: OMIM: 605890; MGI: 2154274; GeneCards: EHD2
Available structures
PDB	Ortholog search: PDBe RCSB
PDB	List of PDB id codes 2QPT, 4CID

Gene location (Human)
Chr.	Chromosome 19 (human)
Band	19q13.33	Start	47,713,422 bp
Band	19q13.33	End	47,743,134 bp

Gene location (Mouse)
Chr.	Chromosome 7 (mouse)
Band	7 A2|7 8.65 cM	Start	15,680,883 bp
Band	7 A2|7 8.65 cM	End	15,701,492 bp
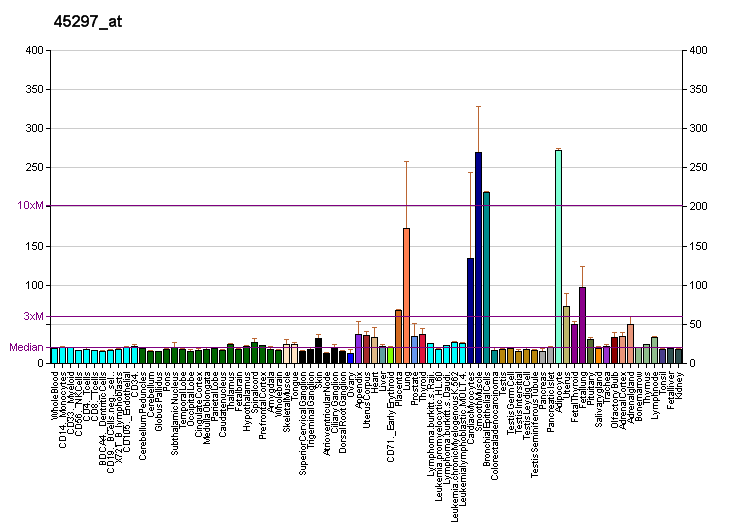

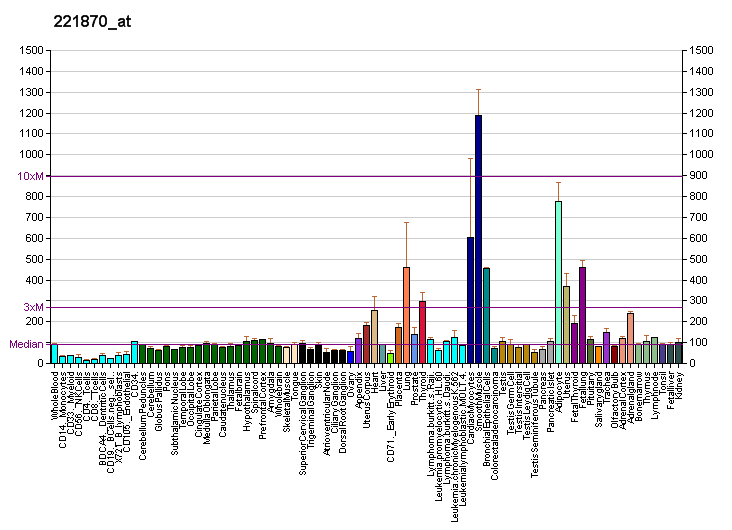

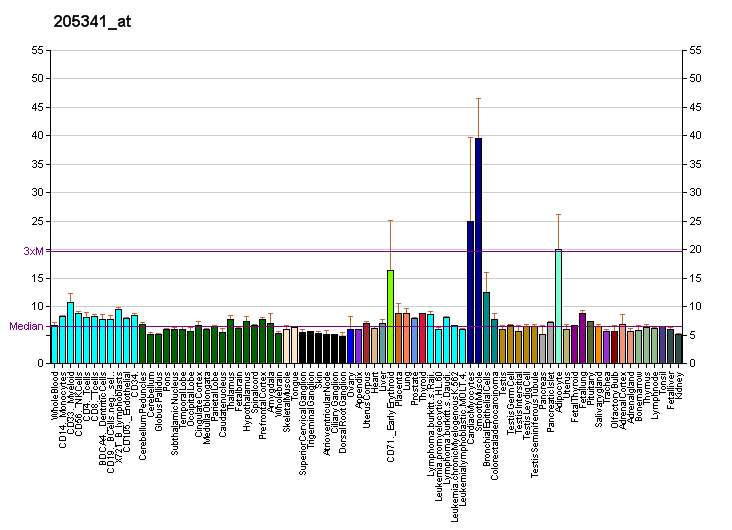
RNA expression pattern
Bgee	Human / Mouse (ortholog); Top expressed in: stromal cell of endometrium; right coronary artery; popliteal artery; tibial arteries; subcutaneous adipose tissue; left coronary artery; Descending thoracic aorta; ascending aorta; right lung; canal of the cervix / Top expressed in: ascending aorta; aortic valve; brown adipose tissue; left lung; right lung; left lung lobe; right lung lobe; ankle; subcutaneous adipose tissue; white adipose tissue; More reference expression data
BioGPS	More reference expression data
Gene ontology
Molecular function	protein binding; metal ion binding; protein domain specific binding; nucleotide binding; calcium ion binding; GTP binding; hydrolase activity; ATP binding; nucleic acid binding; identical protein binding
Cellular component	caveola; endosome membrane; recycling endosome membrane; cytoplasm; cytosol; nucleus; membrane; perinuclear region of cytoplasm; endosome; extrinsic component of membrane; extracellular exosome; plasma membrane; microtubule cytoskeleton; intercellular bridge
Biological process	blood coagulation; endocytosis; protein localization to plasma membrane; plasma membrane tubulation; positive regulation of myoblast fusion; positive regulation of endocytic recycling; actin cytoskeleton organization; cortical actin cytoskeleton organization; endocytic recycling
Sources:Amigo / QuickGO
Orthologs
Databases	NCBI: entry; OMA: entry
Species	Human	Mouse
Entrez	30846	259300
Ensembl	ENSG00000024422	ENSMUSG00000074364
UniProt	Q9NZN4	Q8BH64
RefSeq (mRNA)	NM_014601	NM_153068
RefSeq (protein)	NP_055416	NP_694708
Location (UCSC)	Chr 19: 47.71 – 47.74 Mb	Chr 7: 15.68 – 15.7 Mb
PubMed search
- Wikidata
View/Edit Human	View/Edit Mouse

EH-domain containing 2, also known as EHD2, is a human gene belonging to the EHD protein family.
