= EHD4 =

Protein-coding gene in the species Homo sapiens

Identifiers
- Aliases: EHD4, PAST4, EH domain containing 4
- External IDs: OMIM: 605892; MGI: 1919619; GeneCards: EHD4

Gene location (Human)
Chr.	Chromosome 15 (human)
Band	15q15.1	Start	41,895,933 bp
Band	15q15.1	End	41,972,557 bp

Gene location (Mouse)
Chr.	Chromosome 2 (mouse)
Band	2|2 E5	Start	119,919,656 bp
Band	2|2 E5	End	119,985,087 bp
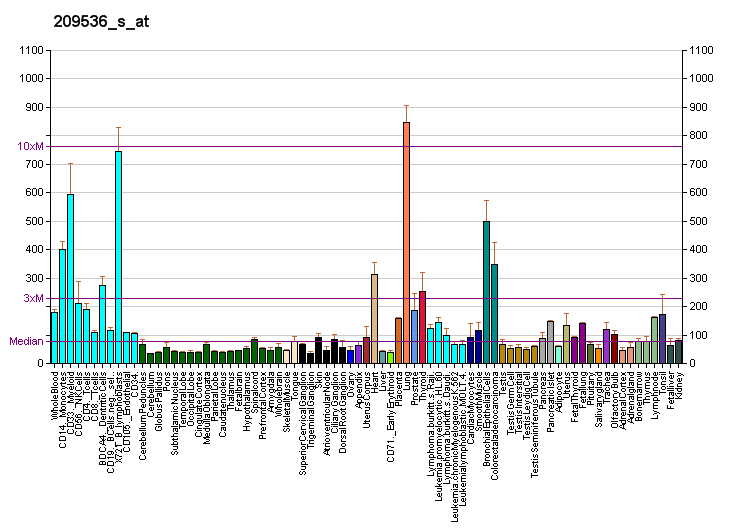
RNA expression pattern
Bgee	Human / Mouse (ortholog); Top expressed in: right ventricle; synovial joint; buccal mucosa cell; pericardium; mucosa of sigmoid colon; mucosa of urinary bladder; synovial membrane; olfactory bulb; epithelium of bronchus; bronchial epithelial cell / Top expressed in: interventricular septum; stroma of bone marrow; myocardium of ventricle; right lung; right lung lobe; cardiac muscles; right ventricle; left ventricle; transitional epithelium of urinary bladder; zygote; More reference expression data
BioGPS	More reference expression data
Gene ontology
Molecular function	nucleotide binding; calcium ion binding; GTP binding; metal ion binding; protein binding; nucleic acid binding; ATP binding; cadherin binding
Cellular component	endosome; early endosome membrane; membrane; plasma membrane; recycling endosome membrane; endoplasmic reticulum; perinuclear region of cytoplasm; extracellular exosome; nucleus
Biological process	regulation of endocytosis; cellular response to growth factor stimulus; endocytic recycling; positive regulation of peptidyl-tyrosine phosphorylation; pinocytosis; protein homooligomerization
Sources:Amigo / QuickGO
Orthologs
Databases	NCBI: entry; OMA: entry
Species	Human	Mouse
Entrez	30844	98878
Ensembl	ENSG00000103966	ENSMUSG00000027293
UniProt	Q9H223	Q9EQP2
RefSeq (mRNA)	NM_139265	NM_133838
RefSeq (protein)	NP_644670	NP_598599
Location (UCSC)	Chr 15: 41.9 – 41.97 Mb	Chr 2: 119.92 – 119.99 Mb
PubMed search
- Wikidata
View/Edit Human	View/Edit Mouse

EH-domain containing 4, also known as EHD4, is a human gene belonging to the EHD protein family.
