= EHD1 =

Protein-coding gene in the species Homo sapiens

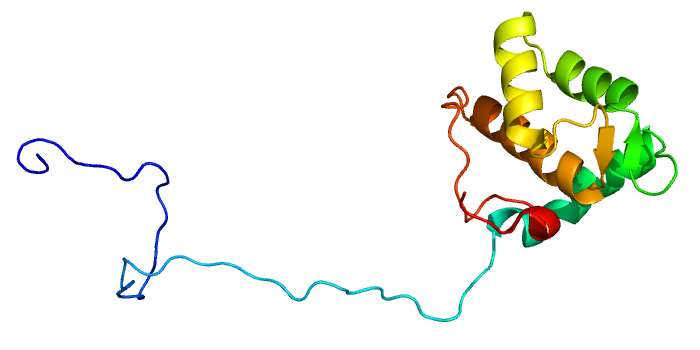

Identifiers
- Aliases: EHD1, H-PAST, HPAST1, PAST, PAST1, EH domain containing 1
- External IDs: OMIM: 605888; MGI: 1341878; GeneCards: EHD1
Available structures
PDB	Ortholog search: PDBe RCSB
PDB	List of PDB id codes 2JQ6, 2KFF, 2KFG, 2KFH, 2KSP

Gene location (Human)
Chr.	Chromosome 11 (human)
Band	11q13.1	Start	64,851,642 bp
Band	11q13.1	End	64,888,296 bp

Gene location (Mouse)
Chr.	Chromosome 19 (mouse)
Band	19 A|19 4.4 cM	Start	6,326,755 bp
Band	19 A|19 4.4 cM	End	6,350,126 bp
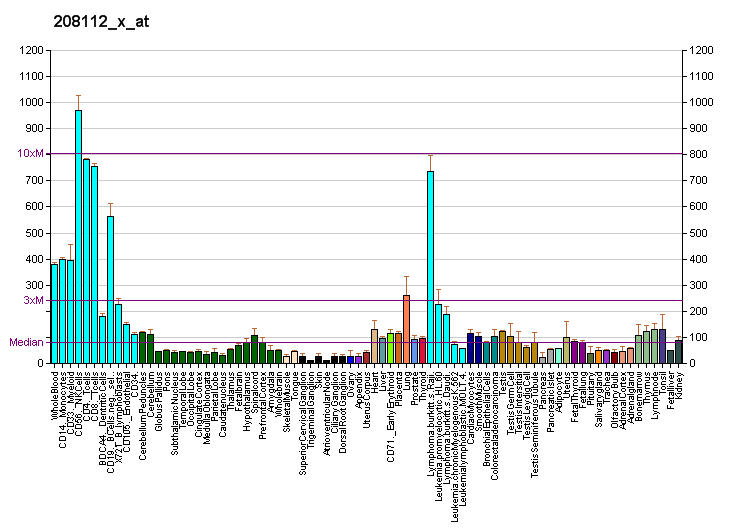

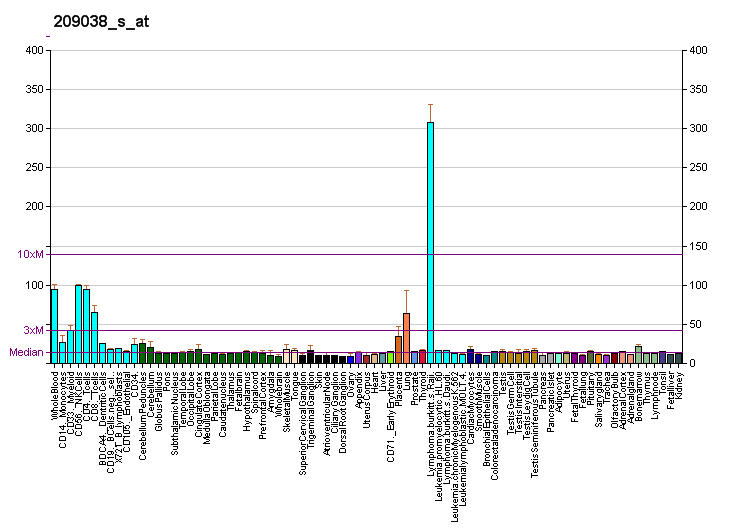

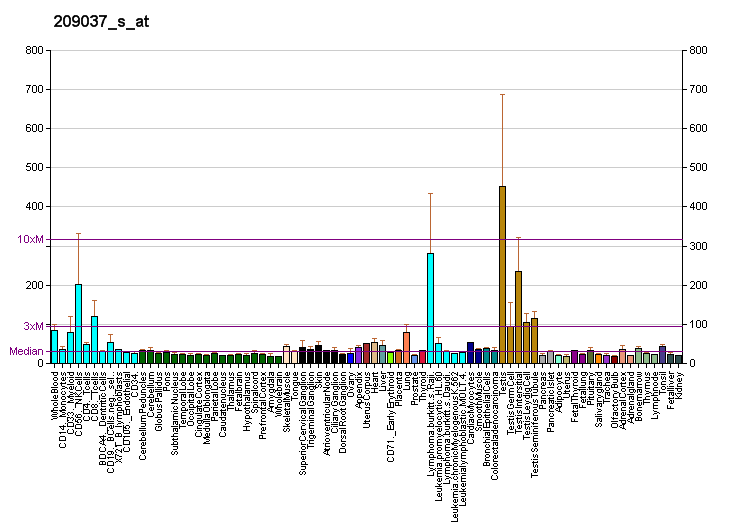
RNA expression pattern
Bgee	Human / Mouse (ortholog); Top expressed in: left testis; right testis; granulocyte; blood; spleen; appendix; apex of heart; right coronary artery; lymph node; right hemisphere of cerebellum / Top expressed in: granulocyte; testicle; white adipose tissue; yolk sac; placenta; spermatid; jejunum; human kidney; circulatory system; heart; More reference expression data
BioGPS	More reference expression data
Gene ontology
Molecular function	nucleotide binding; calcium ion binding; GTP binding; metal ion binding; protein binding; ATP binding; cadherin binding; identical protein binding
Cellular component	endosome; cell projection; early endosome membrane; membrane; lipid droplet; plasma membrane; cilium; recycling endosome membrane; platelet dense tubular network membrane; ciliary membrane; ciliary pocket membrane; endosome membrane; extracellular exosome
Biological process	cellular response to nerve growth factor stimulus; endocytosis; low-density lipoprotein particle clearance; positive regulation of cholesterol storage; blood coagulation; positive regulation of myoblast fusion; cell projection organization; protein localization to cilium; positive regulation of endocytic recycling; cholesterol homeostasis; intracellular protein transport; protein homooligomerization; neuron projection development; protein transport; endocytic recycling; cilium assembly; transport
Sources:Amigo / QuickGO
Orthologs
Databases	NCBI: entry; OMA: entry
Species	Human	Mouse
Entrez	10938	13660
Ensembl	ENSG00000110047	ENSMUSG00000024772
UniProt	Q9H4M9	Q9WVK4
RefSeq (mRNA)	NM_001282444; NM_001282445; NM_006795	NM_010119
RefSeq (protein)	NP_001269373; NP_001269374; NP_006786	NP_034249
Location (UCSC)	Chr 11: 64.85 – 64.89 Mb	Chr 19: 6.33 – 6.35 Mb
PubMed search
- Wikidata
View/Edit Human	View/Edit Mouse

EH domain-containing protein 1, also known as testilin or PAST homolog 1 (PAST1), is a protein that in humans is encoded by the EHD1 gene belonging to the EHD protein family.

== Function ==
This gene belongs to a highly conserved gene family encoding EPS15 homology (EH) domain-containing proteins. The protein-binding EH domain was first noted in EPS15, a substrate for the epidermal growth factor receptor. The EH domain has been shown to be an important motif in proteins involved in protein-protein interactions and in intracellular sorting. The protein encoded by this gene is thought to play a role in the endocytosis of IGF1 receptors.

== Interactions ==
EHD1 has been shown to interact with Insulin-like growth factor 1 receptor and SNAP29.
