= Microvillous inclusion disease =

Microvillus inclusion disease
- Other names: Davidson's disease
- Microvillus inclusion disease has an autosomal recessive pattern of inheritance.

Microvillus inclusion disease, previously known as Davidson's disease, congenital microvillus atrophy and, less specifically, microvillus atrophy (note: microvillus is often misspelled as microvillous), is a rare genetic disorder of the small intestine that is inherited in an autosomal recessive pattern.

== Presentation ==
It is characterized by chronic, intractable diarrhea in new-born infants, starting in the first few days of life. This results in metabolic acidosis and severe dehydration. Pregnancy and birth are usually normal.

== Pathophysiology ==
It is caused by a congenital villus atrophy, atrophy of apical microvilli and intracellular accumulation of apical enzymes and transporters in the epithelial cells of the small intestine. MVID is in most cases caused by mutations in the MYO5B gene. Other genes are also responsible of the disease: STXBP2 or Munc18-2 (also causing Familial Hemophagocytic Lymphohistiocytosis (FHL), STX3 and UNC45A.

== Diagnosis ==
Prenatal screening in utero is currently offered by several medical centers since the gene(s) involved in the disease were recently discovered to be MYO5B; Diagnosis is typically made by biopsy of the small intestine.

=== Biopsy ===
The appearance of microvillous inclusion disease on light microscopy is similar to celiac sprue; however, it usually lacks the intraepithelial lymphocytic infiltration characteristic of celiac sprue and stains positive for carcinoembryonic antigen (CEA). The definitive diagnosis is dependent on electron microscopy.

=== Differential diagnosis ===
The differential diagnosis of chronic and intractable diarrhea is:

- Intestinal epithelial dysplasia
- Syndromatic diarrhea
- Immunoinflammatory enteropathy

== Prognosis ==
It is nearly always fatal unless, like short bowel syndrome patients, treated with parenteral nutrition or an intestinal transplant. The patient is often classified as being in "intestinal failure" and treated with the cohort of patients known as "short bowel syndrome" patients.

One patient from the UK was documented as achieving nutritional independence at age 3. On 26 June 2009, a six-year-old girl with microvillus inclusion disease became the third person in the UK to die of swine flu. This was attributed to her weakened immune system.

== Prevalence ==
Microvillus inclusion disease is extremely rare, however, no prevalence data have been published. An estimate of a few hundred children with the disease in Europe has been made but no time frame to which this count applies is given. Countries with a higher degrees of consanguinity experience higher prevalence rates due to its autosomal recessive transmission.

== History ==
Microvillus inclusion disease was first described in 1978 by Davidson et al. It was originally described as familial enteropathy.
