= SNAP29 =

Protein-coding gene in humans

Identifiers
- Aliases: SNAP29, CEDNIK, SNAP-29, synaptosome associated protein 29kDa, synaptosome associated protein 29
- External IDs: OMIM: 604202; MGI: 1914724; GeneCards: SNAP29
Available structures
| PDB | Ortholog search: PDBe RCSB |
| PDB | List of PDB id codes 4WY4 |

Gene location (Human)
| Chr. | Chromosome 22 (human) |
| Band | 22q11.21 | Start | 20,859,007 bp |
| Band | 22q11.21 | End | 20,891,214 bp |

Gene location (Mouse)
| Chr. | Chromosome 16 (mouse) |
| Band | 16|16 A3 | Start | 17,223,850 bp |
| Band | 16|16 A3 | End | 17,248,691 bp |
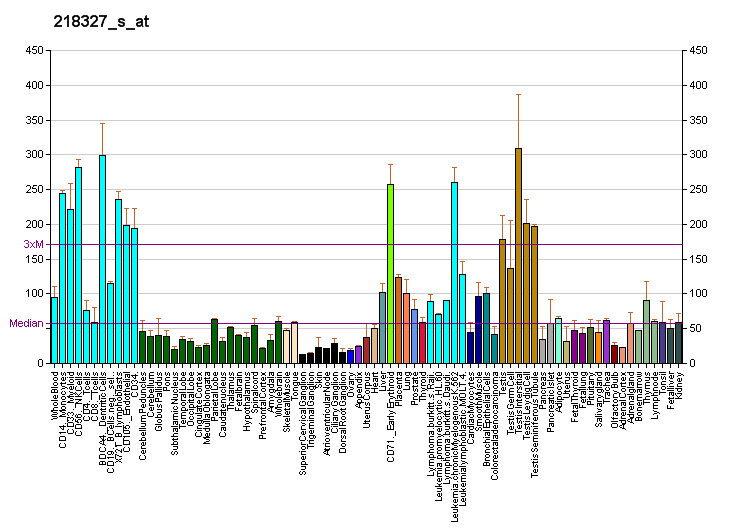
RNA expression pattern
| Bgee | Human / Mouse (ortholog); Top expressed in: left testis; right testis; gonad; buccal mucosa cell; monocyte; tendon of biceps brachii; islet of Langerhans; gastrocnemius muscle; stromal cell of endometrium; liver / Top expressed in: zygote; spermatocyte; secondary oocyte; muscle of thigh; gastrula; spermatid; granulocyte; esophagus; yolk sac; blood; More reference expression data |
| BioGPS | More reference expression data |
Gene ontology
| Molecular function | SNAP receptor activity; protein binding; syntaxin binding |
| Cellular component | cytoplasm; centrosome; Golgi apparatus; cell projection; membrane; plasma membrane; cilium; autophagosome membrane; SNARE complex; ciliary membrane; ciliary pocket membrane; cytoplasmic vesicle; presynapse; Golgi membrane; nucleoplasm; autophagosome; cytosol; azurophil granule membrane; synapse |
| Biological process | vesicle targeting; synaptic vesicle fusion to presynaptic active zone membrane; membrane fusion; autophagy; autophagosome maturation; cell projection organization; synaptic vesicle priming; protein transport; exocytosis; autophagosome membrane docking; neutrophil degranulation; cilium assembly; vesicle fusion |
Sources:Amigo / QuickGO
Orthologs
| Databases | NCBI: entry; OMA: entry |
| Species | Human | Mouse |
| Entrez | 9342 | 67474 |
| Ensembl | ENSG00000099940 | ENSMUSG00000022765 |
| UniProt | O95721 | Q9ERB0 |
| RefSeq (mRNA) | NM_004782 | NM_023348 |
| RefSeq (protein) | NP_004773 | NP_075837 |
| Location (UCSC) | Chr 22: 20.86 – 20.89 Mb | Chr 16: 17.22 – 17.25 Mb |
| PubMed search |
- Wikidata
| View/Edit Human | View/Edit Mouse |

Synaptosomal-associated protein 29 is a protein that in humans is encoded by the SNAP29 gene.

== Function ==
This gene, a member of the SNAP25 gene family, encodes a protein involved in multiple membrane trafficking steps. Two other members of this gene family, SNAP23 and SNAP25, encode proteins that bind a syntaxin protein and mediate synaptic vesicle membrane docking and fusion to the plasma membrane. The protein encoded by this gene binds tightly to multiple syntaxins and is localized to intracellular membrane structures rather than to the plasma membrane. While the protein is mostly membrane-bound, a significant fraction of it is found free in the cytoplasm. Use of multiple polyadenylation sites has been noted for this gene.

== Interactions ==
SNAP29 has been shown to interact with Syntaxin 3 and EHD1.

SNAP29 was shown to interact with CVB3 and EV-D68 viral protease 3C.

== See also ==
- CEDNIK Syndrome
