= CEDNIK syndrome =

Cerebral dysgenesis–neuropathy–ichthyosis–keratoderma syndrome
- Other names: CEDNIK syndrome
- Specialty: Dermatology

Cerebral dysgenesis–neuropathy–ichthyosis–keratoderma syndrome is a neurocutaneous condition caused by mutation in the SNAP29 gene.

== Presentation ==
CEDNIK syndrome is a rare congenital condition that presents as severe developmental failure of the nervous system and the epidermis. Clinical manifestations include microcephaly, cerebral dysgenesis, facial dysmorphism, palmoplantar keratoderma, and ichthyosis.

== Pathophysiology ==
This condition is associated with a loss-of-function mutation in SNAP29 gene, encoding a member of the SNARE family of proteins which is involved in intracellular vesicle fusion. Decrease in SNAP29 expression was found to result in abnormal lamellar granule maturation and secretion. Lamellar granules are organelles found in the upper epidermal layers of skin and is responsible for secretion of lipids, proteases and their inhibitors to stratum corneum during the formation of epidermal barrier. Due to the abnormal vesicle trafficking as a consequence of decreased SNAP29 there is abnormal deposition of epidermal lipids and proteases.

The abnormal gene of CEDNIK disease was mapped on chromosome 22 by Sprecher E et al.

== See also ==
- Arthrogryposis–renal dysfunction–cholestasis syndrome
- List of cutaneous conditions
