= RAB11FIP2 =

Protein-coding gene in the species Homo sapiens

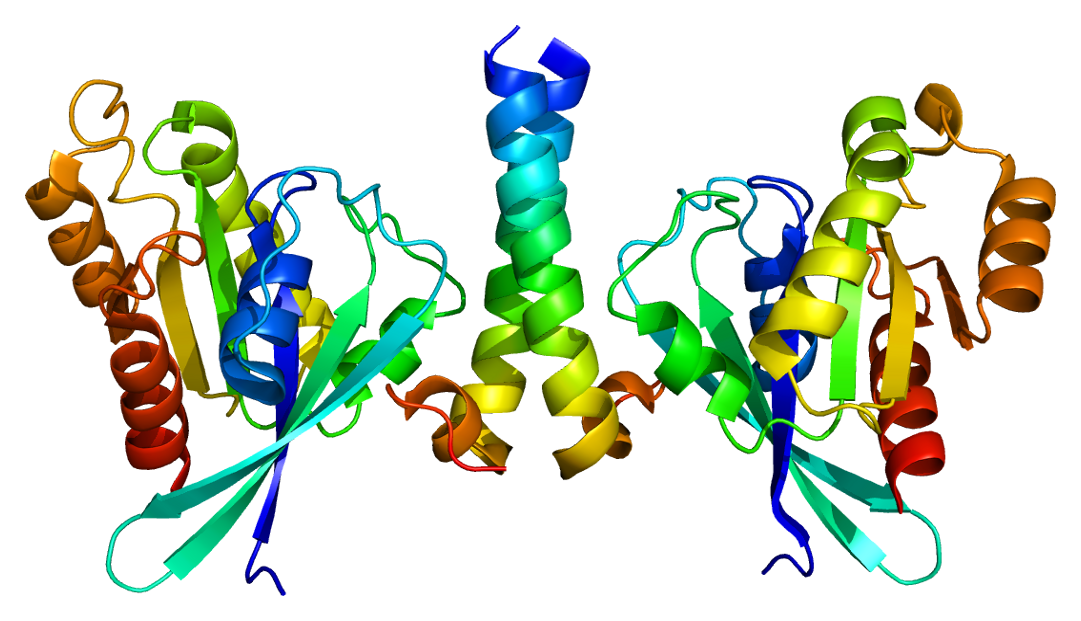

Identifiers
- Aliases: RAB11FIP2, Rab11-FIP2, nRip11, RAB11 family interacting protein 2
- External IDs: OMIM: 608599; MGI: 1922248; GeneCards: RAB11FIP2
Available structures
PDB	Ortholog search: PDBe RCSB
PDB	List of PDB id codes 2GZD, 2GZH, 2K6S, 3TSO, 4C4P

Gene location (Human)
Chr.	Chromosome 10 (human)
Band	10q26.11	Start	118,004,916 bp
Band	10q26.11	End	118,046,941 bp

Gene location (Mouse)
Chr.	Chromosome 19 (mouse)
Band	19|19 D3	Start	59,891,316 bp
Band	19|19 D3	End	59,932,086 bp
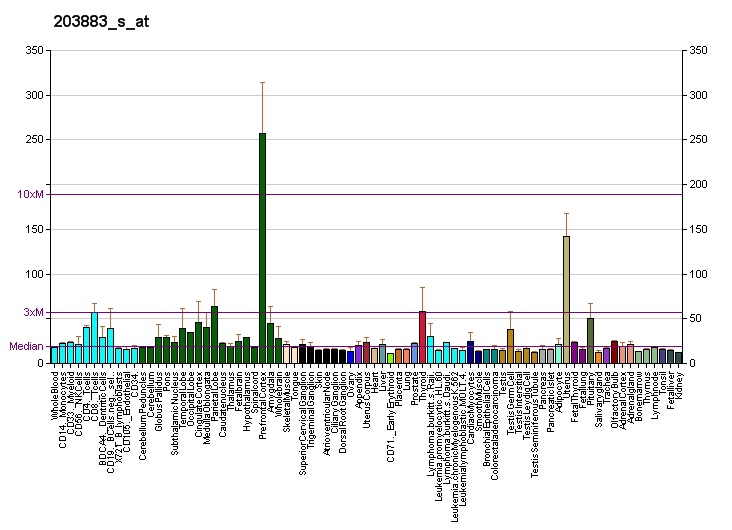

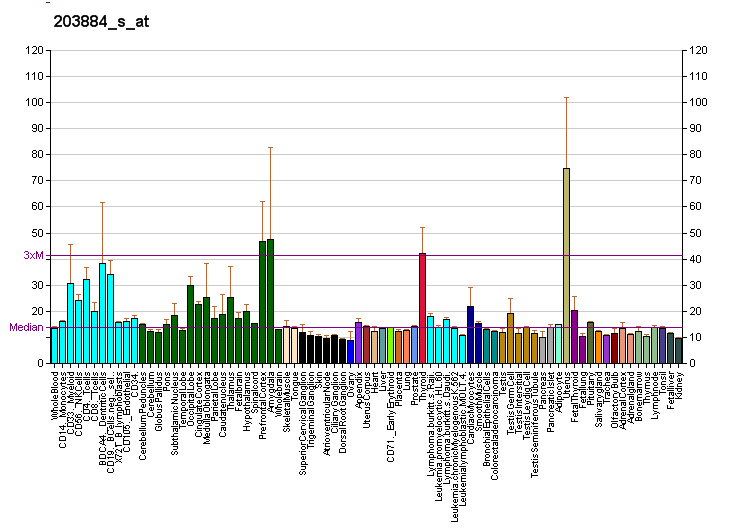
RNA expression pattern
Bgee	Human / Mouse (ortholog); Top expressed in: seminal vesicula; tail of epididymis; corpus epididymis; caput epididymis; postcentral gyrus; entorhinal cortex; skin of hip; lateral nuclear group of thalamus; superior frontal gyrus; cardia / Top expressed in: nucleus accumbens; piriform cortex; temporal lobe; olfactory tubercle; Region I of hippocampus proper; hand; amygdala; anterior amygdaloid area; subiculum; prefrontal cortex; More reference expression data
BioGPS	More reference expression data
Gene ontology
Molecular function	protein binding; protein kinase binding; protein homodimerization activity; identical protein binding
Cellular component	membrane; endosome; recycling endosome membrane; plasma membrane; cytoplasmic vesicle membrane; nucleoplasm; intracellular membrane-bounded organelle; phagocytic cup; cell projection
Biological process	protein transport; regulated exocytosis; renal water homeostasis; establishment of cell polarity; insulin secretion involved in cellular response to glucose stimulus; positive regulation of protein localization to plasma membrane; phagocytosis; TRAM-dependent toll-like receptor 4 signaling pathway; positive regulation of GTPase activity
Sources:Amigo / QuickGO
Orthologs
Databases	NCBI: entry; OMA: entry
Species	Human	Mouse
Entrez	22841	74998
Ensembl	ENSG00000107560	ENSMUSG00000040022
UniProt	Q7L804	G3XA57
RefSeq (mRNA)	NM_014904; NM_001330167	NM_001033172; NM_001164367
RefSeq (protein)	NP_001317096; NP_055719	NP_001028344; NP_001157839
Location (UCSC)	Chr 10: 118 – 118.05 Mb	Chr 19: 59.89 – 59.93 Mb
PubMed search
- Wikidata
View/Edit Human	View/Edit Mouse

Rab11 family-interacting protein 2 is a protein that in humans is encoded by the RAB11FIP2 gene.

== Interactions ==
RAB11FIP2 has been shown to interact with MYO5B, RAB11A and RAB25.
