= GABPB2 =

Protein-coding gene in humans

Identifiers
- Aliases: GABPB2, GABPB-2, GA binding protein transcription factor beta subunit 2, GA binding protein transcription factor subunit beta 2
- External IDs: MGI: 95612; GeneCards: GABPB2

Gene location (Human)
Chr.	Chromosome 1 (human)
Band	1q21.3	Start	151,070,578 bp
Band	1q21.3	End	151,125,542 bp

Gene location (Mouse)
Chr.	Chromosome 3 (mouse)
Band	3 F2.1|3 40.74 cM	Start	95,089,077 bp
Band	3 F2.1|3 40.74 cM	End	95,125,227 bp
RNA expression pattern
Bgee	Human / Mouse (ortholog); Top expressed in: mucosa of ileum; thymus; tibialis anterior muscle; Achilles tendon; tibia; skin of arm; pancreatic ductal cell; cardiac muscle tissue of right atrium; epithelium of nasopharynx; sural nerve / Top expressed in: hand; otolith organ; utricle; lymph node; mesenteric lymph nodes; spleen; thymus; vestibular membrane of cochlear duct; condyle; conjunctival fornix; More reference expression data
BioGPS	n/a
Gene ontology
Molecular function	protein binding; protein homodimerization activity; protein heterodimerization activity; DNA-binding transcription factor activity
Cellular component	nucleus
Biological process	regulation of transcription, DNA-templated; transcription, DNA-templated; positive regulation of transcription by RNA polymerase II
Sources:Amigo / QuickGO
Orthologs
Databases	NCBI: entry; OMA: entry
Species	Human	Mouse
Entrez	126626	213054
Ensembl	ENSG00000143458	ENSMUSG00000038766
UniProt	Q8TAK5	P81069
RefSeq (mRNA)	NM_144618; NM_001323906; NM_001323907; NM_001323908; NM_001323909 NM_001323910; NM_001323911; NM_001323912; NM_001323913	NM_029885; NM_172512
RefSeq (protein)	NP_001310835; NP_001310836; NP_001310837; NP_001310838; NP_001310839 NP_001310840; NP_001310841; NP_001310842; NP_653219	NP_084161; NP_766100
Location (UCSC)	Chr 1: 151.07 – 151.13 Mb	Chr 3: 95.09 – 95.13 Mb
PubMed search
- Wikidata
View/Edit Human	View/Edit Mouse

GA-binding protein subunit beta-2 is a protein that in humans is encoded by the GABPB2 gene. Not much has been reported about the function of this protein, but it may act as a transcription factor that binds to GA repeats. One of the two primary isoforms of this gene's paralog, GABPB1, was originally named "GABPB2", leading to a name conflict, but the naming conventions were eventually clarified in August 2008.
