= GABPB1 =

Protein-coding gene in the species Homo sapiens

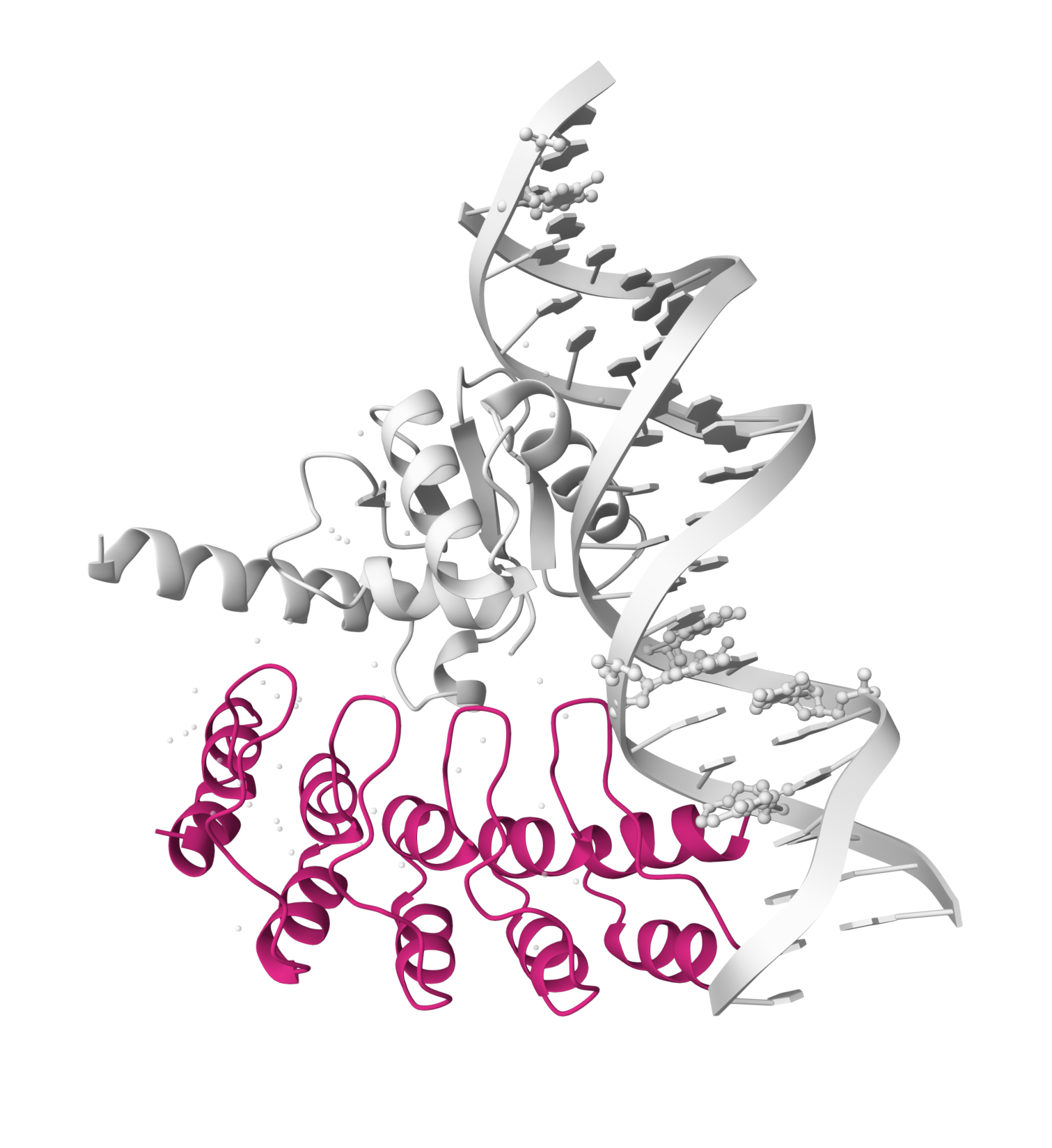

Identifiers
- Aliases: GABPB1, BABPB2, E4TF1, E4TF1-47, E4TF1-53, E4TF1B, GABPB, GABPB2, NRF2B1, NRF2B2, GABPB-1, GA binding protein transcription factor beta subunit 1, GA binding protein transcription factor subunit beta 1
- External IDs: OMIM: 600610; MGI: 95611; GeneCards: GABPB1
Available structures
PDB	Ortholog search: PDBe RCSB
PDB	List of PDB id codes 1AWC

Gene location (Human)
Chr.	Chromosome 15 (human)
Band	15q21.2	Start	50,275,389 bp
Band	15q21.2	End	50,355,408 bp

Gene location (Mouse)
Chr.	Chromosome 2 (mouse)
Band	2 F1|2 61.76 cM	Start	126,469,362 bp
Band	2 F1|2 61.76 cM	End	126,518,257 bp
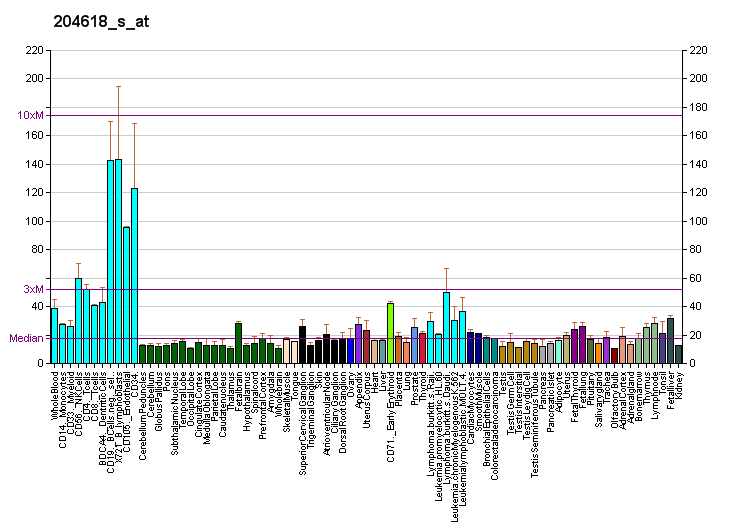

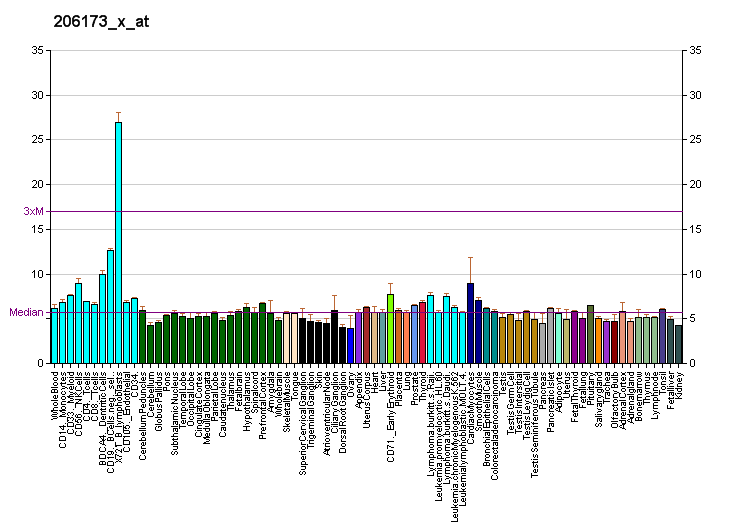
RNA expression pattern
Bgee	Human / Mouse (ortholog); Top expressed in: secondary oocyte; cartilage tissue; bone marrow cell; ventricular zone; ganglionic eminence; Achilles tendon; stromal cell of endometrium; testicle; gonad; lactiferous duct / Top expressed in: tail of embryo; ventricular zone; granulocyte; genital tubercle; thymus; ganglionic eminence; epiblast; spermatid; embryo; primary oocyte; More reference expression data
BioGPS	More reference expression data
Gene ontology
Molecular function	DNA-binding transcription factor activity; protein heterodimerization activity; protein binding
Cellular component	nucleus; nucleoplasm; cytoplasmic ribonucleoprotein granule
Biological process	regulation of transcription, DNA-templated; mitochondrion organization; positive regulation of transcription by RNA polymerase II; regulation of transcription by RNA polymerase II; transcription, DNA-templated
Sources:Amigo / QuickGO
Orthologs
Databases	NCBI: entry; OMA: entry
Species	Human	Mouse
Entrez	2553	14391
Ensembl	ENSG00000104064	ENSMUSG00000027361
UniProt	Q06547	Q00420
RefSeq (mRNA)	NM_002041; NM_005254; NM_016654; NM_016655; NM_181427 NM_001320910; NM_001320915	NM_001271467; NM_001271468; NM_001271469; NM_001271470; NM_001271492 NM_010249; NM_207669; NM_001355108; NM_001355109
RefSeq (protein)	NP_001307839; NP_001307844; NP_002032; NP_005245; NP_057738 NP_057739; NP_852092; NP_057738.1	NP_001258396; NP_001258397; NP_001258398; NP_001258399; NP_001258421 NP_034379; NP_997552; NP_001342037; NP_001342038; NP_001393121; NP_001393122; NP_001393123; NP_001393124; NP_001393125; NP_001393126; NP_001393127; NP_001393128; NP_001393129; NP_001393130; NP_001393131; NP_001393132; NP_001393133; NP_001393134; NP_001393135; NP_001393136; NP_001393137; NP_001393138; NP_001393139; NP_001393140; NP_001393141; NP_001393142; NP_001393143; NP_001393144; NP_001393145; NP_001393146; NP_001393147; NP_001393148; NP_001393149; NP_001393150; NP_001393151; NP_001393152; NP_001393153; NP_001393154; NP_001393155; NP_001393156
Location (UCSC)	Chr 15: 50.28 – 50.36 Mb	Chr 2: 126.47 – 126.52 Mb
PubMed search
- Wikidata
View/Edit Human	View/Edit Mouse

GA-binding protein subunit beta-1 is a protein that in humans is encoded by the GABPB1 gene.

This gene encodes the GA-binding protein transcription factor, beta subunit. This protein forms a tetrameric complex with the alpha subunit, and stimulates transcription of target genes. The encoded protein may be involved in activation of cytochrome oxidase expression and nuclear control of mitochondrial function. The crystal structure of a similar protein in mouse has been resolved as a ternary protein complex. Multiple transcript variants encoding distinct isoforms have been identified for this gene.

== Isoforms and naming conventions ==
The GABPB1 gene has two main isoforms called GABPB1L and GABPB1S. These isoforms were originally named “GABPB1” and “GABPB2” (resp.). This led to a name conflict with this gene’s paralog, GABPB2, which is named after its mouse homolog Gabpb2. Adding to the confusion, in 1995, a GABPA pseudogene on chromosome 7 (now called GABPAP) was misidentified as the gene encoding the GABPB1L/GABPB1S proteins. This was clarified in August 2008, with the chromosome 14 paralog (this gene) being denoted GABPB1, while the chromosome 1 paralog was denoted GABPB2.
