= GPR155 =

Protein-coding gene in the species Homo sapiens

Identifiers
- Aliases: GPR155, DEP.7, DEPDC3, PGR22, G protein-coupled receptor 155
- External IDs: MGI: 1915776; GeneCards: GPR155

Gene location (Human)
Chr.	Chromosome 2 (human)
Band	2q31.1	Start	174,431,571 bp
Band	2q31.1	End	174,487,094 bp

Gene location (Mouse)
Chr.	Chromosome 2 (mouse)
Band	2|2 C3	Start	73,171,850 bp
Band	2|2 C3	End	73,216,916 bp
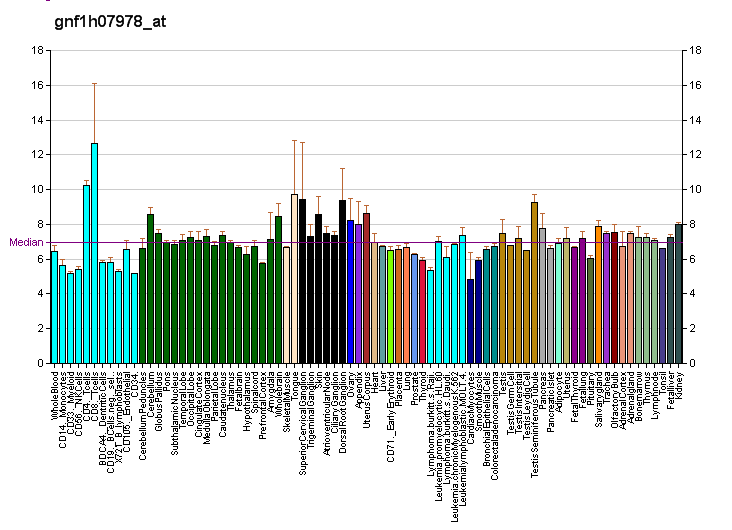

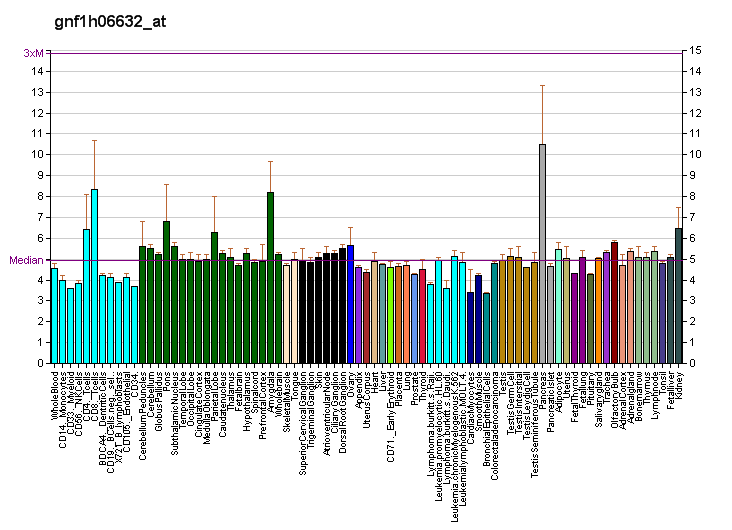
RNA expression pattern
Bgee	Human / Mouse (ortholog); Top expressed in: spinal ganglia; trigeminal ganglion; cardia; external globus pallidus; cerebellar vermis; middle temporal gyrus; Brodmann area 46; Brodmann area 23; lateral nuclear group of thalamus; parietal lobe / Top expressed in: olfactory epithelium; submandibular gland; dorsal striatum; lacrimal gland; prostate; lobe of prostate; globus pallidus; olfactory tubercle; nucleus accumbens; sciatic nerve; More reference expression data
BioGPS	More reference expression data
Gene ontology
Molecular function	molecular function
Cellular component	integral component of membrane; extracellular exosome; membrane; cytoplasm
Biological process	intracellular signal transduction; cognition; transmembrane transport
Sources:Amigo / QuickGO
Orthologs
Databases	NCBI: entry; OMA: entry
Species	Human	Mouse
Entrez	151556	68526
Ensembl	ENSG00000163328	ENSMUSG00000041762
UniProt	Q7Z3F1; Q49AJ5	n/a
RefSeq (mRNA)	NM_001033045; NM_001267050; NM_001267051; NM_152529	NM_001080707; NM_001190297; NM_001276443; NM_001276444
RefSeq (protein)	NP_001028217; NP_001253979; NP_001253980; NP_689742; NP_001253980.1	n/a
Location (UCSC)	Chr 2: 174.43 – 174.49 Mb	Chr 2: 73.17 – 73.22 Mb
PubMed search
- Wikidata
View/Edit Human	View/Edit Mouse

Integral membrane protein GPR155, also known as G protein-coupled receptor 155, is a protein that in humans is encoded by the GPR155 gene. Mutations in this gene may be associated with autism.
