= GNG12 =

Protein-coding gene in humans

Identifiers
- Aliases: GNG12, G protein subunit gamma 12, HG3A
- External IDs: OMIM: 615405; MGI: 1336171; GeneCards: GNG12

Gene location (Human)
Chr.	Chromosome 1 (human)
Band	1p31.3	Start	67,701,475 bp
Band	1p31.3	End	67,833,467 bp

Gene location (Mouse)
Chr.	Chromosome 6 (mouse)
Band	6 C1|6 30.68 cM	Start	66,873,381 bp
Band	6 C1|6 30.68 cM	End	66,998,334 bp
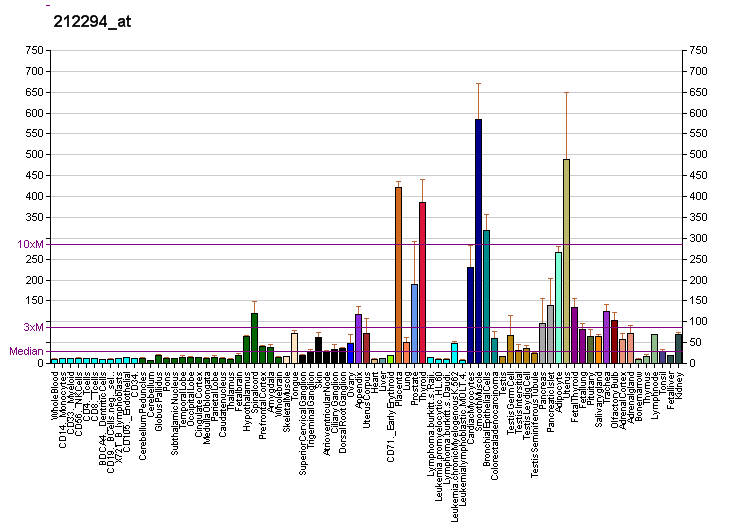
RNA expression pattern
Bgee	Human / Mouse (ortholog); Top expressed in: jejunal mucosa; skin of thigh; nipple; secondary oocyte; duodenum; skin of hip; human penis; saphenous vein; synovial joint; vulva / Top expressed in: gastrula; Ileal epithelium; right kidney; yolk sac; islet of Langerhans; uterus; jejunum; cervix; zygote; ascending aorta; More reference expression data
BioGPS	More reference expression data
Gene ontology
Molecular function	phosphate ion binding; PDZ domain binding; protein binding; signal transducer activity; GTPase activity; G-protein beta-subunit binding
Cellular component	plasma membrane; extracellular exosome; membrane; actin filament; heterotrimeric G-protein complex; G-protein beta/gamma-subunit complex
Biological process	cerebral cortex development; G protein-coupled receptor signaling pathway; cellular response to glucagon stimulus; response to lipopolysaccharide; signal transduction
Sources:Amigo / QuickGO
Orthologs
Databases	NCBI: entry; OMA: entry
Species	Human	Mouse
Entrez	55970	14701
Ensembl	ENSG00000172380	ENSMUSG00000036402
UniProt	Q9UBI6	Q9DAS9
RefSeq (mRNA)	NM_018841	NM_001177556; NM_001177557; NM_001177558; NM_001177559; NM_001177560 NM_025278
RefSeq (protein)	NP_061329	NP_001171027; NP_001171028; NP_001171029; NP_001171030; NP_001171031 NP_079554
Location (UCSC)	Chr 1: 67.7 – 67.83 Mb	Chr 6: 66.87 – 67 Mb
PubMed search
- Wikidata
View/Edit Human	View/Edit Mouse

Guanine nucleotide-binding protein G(I)/G(S)/G(O) subunit gamma-12 is a protein that in humans is encoded by the GNG12 gene.
