= GLYCTK =

Protein-coding gene in humans

Identifiers
- Aliases: GLYCTK, Glyctk, 6230410P16Rik, C430006L12, HBEBP2, HBEBP4, HBeAgBP4A, glycerate kinase
- External IDs: OMIM: 610516; MGI: 2444085; GeneCards: GLYCTK
Enzyme activity
EC #	BRENDA	ExPASy	KEGG	MetaCyc
2.7.1.31	↗	↗	↗	↗

Gene location (Human)
Chr.	Chromosome 3 (human)
Band	3p21.2	Start	52,287,089 bp
Band	3p21.2	End	52,295,257 bp

Gene location (Mouse)
Chr.	Chromosome 9 (mouse)
Band	9|9 F1	Start	106,030,056 bp
Band	9|9 F1	End	106,035,337 bp
RNA expression pattern
Bgee	Human / Mouse (ortholog); Top expressed in: right lobe of liver; mucosa of transverse colon; mucosa of ileum; duodenum; granulocyte; pancreatic ductal cell; human kidney; jejunal mucosa; gonad; body of stomach / Top expressed in: right kidney; spermatocyte; proximal tubule; human kidney; yolk sac; hepatobiliary system; liver; left lobe of liver; spermatid; right ventricle; More reference expression data
BioGPS	n/a
Gene ontology
Molecular function	transferase activity; nucleotide binding; protein binding; ATP binding; kinase activity; glycerate kinase activity
Cellular component	cytoplasm; mitochondrion; Golgi apparatus; cytosol
Biological process	protein phosphorylation; phosphorylation; fructose catabolic process to hydroxyacetone phosphate and glyceraldehyde-3-phosphate
Sources:Amigo / QuickGO
Orthologs
Databases	NCBI: entry; OMA: entry
Species	Human	Mouse
Entrez	132158	235582
Ensembl	ENSG00000168237	ENSMUSG00000020258
UniProt	Q8IVS8	Q8QZY2
RefSeq (mRNA)	NM_001144951; NM_145262	NM_001039586; NM_174846
RefSeq (protein)	NP_001138423; NP_660305; NP_660305.2	NP_001034675; NP_777271
Location (UCSC)	Chr 3: 52.29 – 52.3 Mb	Chr 9: 106.03 – 106.04 Mb
PubMed search
- Wikidata
View/Edit Human	View/Edit Mouse

Glycerate kinase is a protein that in humans is encoded by the GLYCTK gene. Glycerate kinase is a small molecule kinase that catalyzes the phosphorylation of (R)-glycerate. It is found within the Golgi apparatus and mitochondrion.
