= Double zinc ribbon and ankyrin repeat-containing protein 1 =

Protein in homo sapiens

DZANK1

Identifiers
- Aliases: DZANK1, ANKRD64, C20orf12, C20orf84, bA189K21.1, bA189K21.8, dJ568F9.2, double zinc ribbon and ankyrin repeat domains 1
- External IDs: MGI: 2139080; GeneCards: DZANK1

Gene location (Human)
Chr.	Chromosome 20 (human)
Band	20p11.23	Start	18,383,367 bp
Band	20p11.23	End	18,467,281 bp

Gene location (Mouse)
Chr.	Chromosome 2 (mouse)
Band	2|2 G1	Start	144,312,477 bp
Band	2|2 G1	End	144,369,334 bp
RNA expression pattern
Bgee	Human / Mouse (ortholog); Top expressed in: sperm; bronchial epithelial cell; right uterine tube; testicle; mucosa of paranasal sinus; endothelial cell; epithelium of nasopharynx; Brodmann area 23; Epithelium of choroid plexus; gonad / Top expressed in: lateral hypothalamus; ventral tegmental area; ventromedial nucleus; superior colliculus; paraventricular nucleus of hypothalamus; dorsal tegmental nucleus; substantia nigra; inferior colliculi; medial vestibular nucleus; dorsomedial hypothalamic nucleus; More reference expression data
BioGPS	n/a
Orthologs
Databases	NCBI: entry; OMA: entry
Species	Human	Mouse
Entrez	55184	241688
Ensembl	ENSG00000089091	ENSMUSG00000037259
UniProt	Q9NVP4	Q8C008
RefSeq (mRNA)	NM_001099407; NM_018152; NM_001351683; NM_001351684; NM_001367611 NM_001367612; NM_001367613; NM_001367614; NM_001367617; NM_001367618; NM_001367619	NM_172859; NM_001360361; NM_001360362; NM_001360363
RefSeq (protein)	NP_001092877; NP_001338612; NP_001338613; NP_001354540; NP_001354541 NP_001354542; NP_001354543; NP_001354546; NP_001354547; NP_001354548; NP_060622	NP_766447; NP_001347290; NP_001347291; NP_001347292
Location (UCSC)	Chr 20: 18.38 – 18.47 Mb	Chr 2: 144.31 – 144.37 Mb
PubMed search
- Wikidata
View/Edit Human	View/Edit Mouse

Double zinc ribbon and ankyrin repeat-containing protein 1 is a protein in humans encoded by the DZANK1 gene.
