= FAD-dependent oxidoreductase domain-containing protein 2 =

Protein in homo sapiens

FOXRED2

Identifiers
- Aliases: FOXRED2, ERFAD, FAD dependent oxidoreductase domain containing 2
- External IDs: OMIM: 613777; MGI: 106315; HomoloGene: 11800; GeneCards: FOXRED2; OMA:FOXRED2 - orthologs

Gene location (Human)
Chr.	Chromosome 22 (human)
Band	22q12.3	Start	36,487,190 bp
Band	22q12.3	End	36,507,221 bp

Gene location (Mouse)
Chr.	Chromosome 15 (mouse)
Band	15 E1|15 36.92 cM	Start	77,824,722 bp
Band	15 E1|15 36.92 cM	End	77,840,922 bp
RNA expression pattern
Bgee	Human / Mouse (ortholog); Top expressed in: buccal mucosa cell; tendon of biceps brachii; ventricular zone; prefrontal cortex; ganglionic eminence; cingulate gyrus; anterior cingulate cortex; Brodmann area 9; gonad; right frontal lobe / Top expressed in: secondary oocyte; parotid gland; otic vesicle; primary oocyte; lumbar subsegment of spinal cord; granulocyte; lacrimal gland; hand; otolith organ; utricle; More reference expression data
BioGPS	n/a
Gene ontology
Molecular function	oxidoreductase activity; protein binding; flavin adenine dinucleotide binding
Cellular component	endoplasmic reticulum lumen; endoplasmic reticulum
Biological process	ubiquitin-dependent ERAD pathway
Sources:Amigo / QuickGO
Orthologs
Species	Human	Mouse
Entrez	80020	239554
Ensembl	ENSG00000100350	ENSMUSG00000016552
UniProt	Q8IWF2	Q3USW5
RefSeq (mRNA)	NM_001102371; NM_024955; NM_001363041; NM_001363042	NM_001017983; NM_001168260
RefSeq (protein)	NP_001095841; NP_079231; NP_001349970; NP_001349971	NP_001017983; NP_001161732
Location (UCSC)	Chr 22: 36.49 – 36.51 Mb	Chr 15: 77.82 – 77.84 Mb
PubMed search
- Wikidata
View/Edit Human	View/Edit Mouse

FAD-dependent oxidoreductase domain-containing protein 2 is a protein in humans encoded by the FOXRED2 gene.
