= Band 4.1-like protein 4A =

Protein in homo sapiens

EPB41L4A

Identifiers
- Aliases: EPB41L4A, EPB41L4, NBL4, erythrocyte membrane protein band 4.1 like 4A
- External IDs: OMIM: 612141; MGI: 103007; GeneCards: EPB41L4A

Gene location (Human)
Chr.	Chromosome 5 (human)
Band	5q22.1-q22.2	Start	112,142,441 bp
Band	5q22.1-q22.2	End	112,419,313 bp

Gene location (Mouse)
Chr.	Chromosome 18 (mouse)
Band	18|18 B1	Start	33,929,380 bp
Band	18|18 B1	End	34,140,019 bp
RNA expression pattern
Bgee	Human / Mouse (ortholog); Top expressed in: palpebral conjunctiva; Achilles tendon; ventricular zone; sural nerve; bronchial epithelial cell; corpus epididymis; retinal pigment epithelium; ganglionic eminence; gonad; gallbladder / Top expressed in: epithelium of lens; vestibular membrane of cochlear duct; medullary collecting duct; conjunctival fornix; right lung lobe; superior cervical ganglion; vestibular sensory epithelium; primary oocyte; epithelium of stomach; endothelial cell of lymphatic vessel; More reference expression data
BioGPS	n/a
Gene ontology
Molecular function	cytoskeletal protein binding; structural constituent of cytoskeleton; molecular function
Cellular component	cytoplasm; cytoskeleton; cellular component
Biological process	actomyosin structure organization; biological process
Sources:Amigo / QuickGO
Orthologs
Databases	NCBI: entry; OMA: entry
Species	Human	Mouse
Entrez	64097	13824
Ensembl	ENSG00000129595	ENSMUSG00000024376
UniProt	Q9HCS5; Q8NEH8	P52963
RefSeq (mRNA)	NM_022140; NM_001347887; NM_001347888	NM_013512
RefSeq (protein)	NP_071423; NP_001334816; NP_001334817; NP_071423.3	NP_038540
Location (UCSC)	Chr 5: 112.14 – 112.42 Mb	Chr 18: 33.93 – 34.14 Mb
PubMed search
- Wikidata
View/Edit Human	View/Edit Mouse

Band 4.1-like protein 4A is a protein in humans encoded by the EPB41L4A gene.
