= GPR150 =

Protein-coding gene in the species Homo sapiens

Identifiers
- Aliases: GPR150, PGR11, G protein-coupled receptor 150
- External IDs: MGI: 2441872; GeneCards: GPR150

Gene location (Human)
Chr.	Chromosome 5 (human)
Band	5q15	Start	95,620,087 bp
Band	5q15	End	95,622,142 bp

Gene location (Mouse)
Chr.	Chromosome 13 (mouse)
Band	13|13 C1	Start	76,202,970 bp
Band	13|13 C1	End	76,205,115 bp
RNA expression pattern
Bgee	Human / Mouse (ortholog); Top expressed in: body of pancreas; stromal cell of endometrium; Brodmann area 9; superior frontal gyrus; prefrontal cortex; anterior cingulate cortex; right frontal lobe; primary visual cortex; body of stomach; fundus / Top expressed in: embryo; morula; dentate gyrus of hippocampal formation granule cell; superior frontal gyrus; primary visual cortex; neural tube; cerebellar cortex; yolk sac; proximal tubule; hippocampus proper; More reference expression data
BioGPS	n/a
Gene ontology
Molecular function	G protein-coupled receptor activity; signal transducer activity
Cellular component	integral component of membrane; plasma membrane; membrane; integral component of plasma membrane
Biological process	signal transduction; G protein-coupled receptor signaling pathway; cellular response to hormone stimulus
Sources:Amigo / QuickGO
Orthologs
Databases	NCBI: entry; OMA: entry
Species	Human	Mouse
Entrez	285601	238725
Ensembl	ENSG00000178015	ENSMUSG00000045509
UniProt	Q8NGU9	Q8BL07
RefSeq (mRNA)	NM_199243	NM_175495
RefSeq (protein)	NP_954713	NP_780704
Location (UCSC)	Chr 5: 95.62 – 95.62 Mb	Chr 13: 76.2 – 76.21 Mb
PubMed search
- Wikidata
View/Edit Human	View/Edit Mouse

Probable G-protein coupled receptor 150 is a protein that in humans is encoded by the GPR150 gene.
