= Eukaryotic initiation factor 4F =

Multiprotein complex used in gene expression

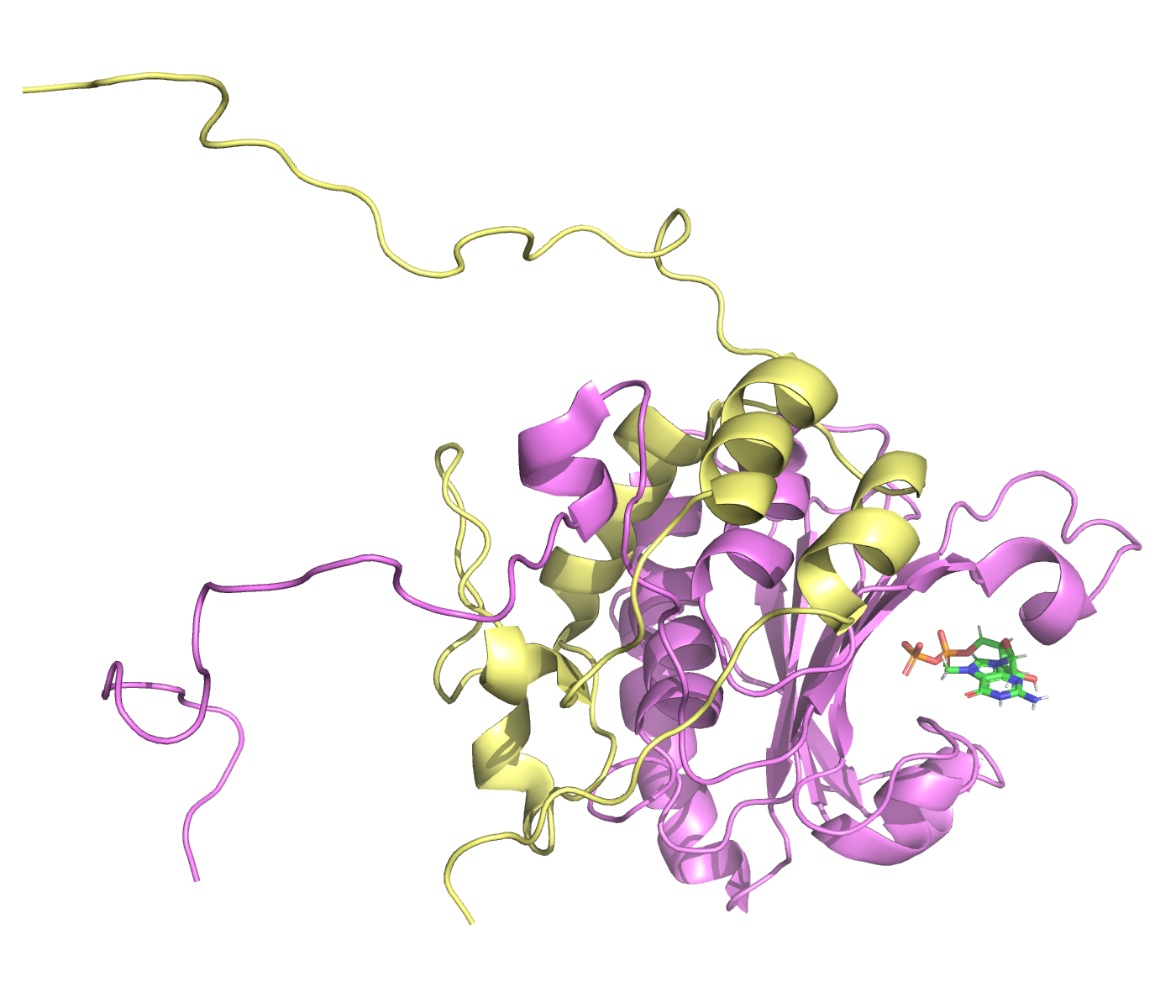
Solution structure of yeast eIF4E bound to the m7G cap and a eIF4G fragment (PDB 1RF8).

Eukaryotic initiation factor 4F (eIF4F) is a heterotrimeric protein complex that binds the 5' cap of messenger RNAs (mRNAs) to promote eukaryotic translation initiation. The eIF4F complex is composed of three non-identical subunits: the DEAD-box RNA helicase eIF4A, the cap-binding protein eIF4E, and the large "scaffold" protein eIF4G. The mammalian eIF4F complex was first described in 1983, and has been a major area of study into the molecular mechanisms of cap-dependent translation initiation ever since.

== Function ==
eIF4F is important for recruiting the small ribosomal subunit (40S) to the 5' cap of mRNAs during cap-dependent translation initiation. Components of the complex are also involved in cap-independent translation initiation; for instance, certain viral proteases cleave eIF4G to remove the eIF4E-binding region, thus inhibiting cap-dependent translation.

== Structure ==
Structures of eIF4F components have been solved individually and as partial complexes by a variety of methods, but no complete experimental structure of eIF4F is available as of 2015.

In 2020, a cryo-electron microscopy structure of a human 48S translation preinitiation complex resolved eIF4A and 4G clearly, with a blurry blob that matches the previously known shape of 4E; this is among the first experimental structures of the complete complex. In 2024, a cryo-electron microscopy structure of the human 48S PIC in the "scanning" state resolved eIF4A and 4G to a resolution of 5.9 Å but did not see eIF4E, suggesting that unlike the two other parts of eIF4F, eIF4E does not stay attached to the ribosome during scanning.

== Subunits ==
In mammals, the eIF4E•G•A trimeric complex can be directly purified from cells, while only the two subunit eIF4E•G can be purified from yeast cells. This suggests that the interaction between the eIF4A and eIF4G in yeast is not as stable. eIF4E binds the m^{7}G 5' cap and the eIF4G scaffold, connecting the mRNA 5' terminus to a hub of other initiation factors and mRNA. The interaction of eIF4G•A is thought to guide the formation of a single-stranded RNA landing pad for the 43S preinitiation complex (43S PIC) via eIF4A's RNA helicase activity.

The eIF4F proteins interact with a number of different binding partners, and there are multiple genetic isoforms of eIF4A, eIF4E, and eIF4G in the human genome. In mammals, eIF4F is bridged to the 40S ribosomal subunit by eIF3 via eIF4G, while budding yeast lacks this connection. Interactions between eIF4G and PABP are thought to mediate the circularization of mRNA particles, forming a "closed-loop" thought to stimulate translation.

Subunit	MW (kDa)^{[A]}	Isoforms	Key Features
eIF4A	46	eIF4A1, eIF4A2, eIF4A3	DEAD-box RNA helicase. Binds mRNA, eIF4G, eIF4B, eIF4H, and PDCD4. Inhibited by the small molecules hippuristanol, rocaglamide A (RocA), and pateamine A. Also present in an extra copy near the ribosomal mRNA entry channel, presumably helping to unwind any secondary structure.
eIF4E	25	eIF4E1, eIF4E2, eIF4E3	Cap-binding protein. Binds eIF4G, 4EBP1, 4EBP2 and 4EBP3.
eIF4G	175	eIF4G1, eIF4G3	"Scaffold" protein. Binds mRNA, eIF4A, eIF4E, and PABP. Enhances the activity of 4A.

^{A} Approximate molecular weight for human proteins.

Of note, different permutations of this complex are possible with different isoforms.

In addition to the major proteins encompassing the eIF4F trimer, the eIF4F complex functionally interacts with proteins including eIF4B and eIF4H, both of which can bind to 4A and stimulate its helicase activity. The unusually short isoform of eIF4G, eIF4G2 or DAP5 (it does not have the parts for binding PABP and eIF4E), also appears to perform a non-canonical translation function.

The stoichiometry between the 4A/E/G subunits is far from 1:1:1 in most studied eukaryotic cells, with the A subunit often in a 10+× excess compared to the other two. This implies a pool of "free" eIF4A in free exchange with the ones bound to eIF4F.

== Regulation ==
Each molecule of PDCD4 can bind two molecules of eIF4A, though physiological complexes are 1:1. By doing so it prevents PDCD4 from forming, inhibiting translation.

The eIF4E subunit of eIF4F is an important target of mTOR signaling through the eIF4E binding protein (4E-BP). Phosphorylation of 4E-BPs by mTOR prevents their binding to eIF4E, freeing eIF4E to bind eIF4G and participate in translation initiation.

== See also ==
- Eukaryotic translation
- Eukaryotic initiation factor
- 5' cap
