= EIF3K =

Protein-coding gene in the species Homo sapiens

Identifiers
- Aliases: EIF3K, EIF3-p28, EIF3S12, HSPC029, M9, MSTP001, PLAC-24, PLAC24, PRO1474, PTD001, ARG134, eukaryotic translation initiation factor 3 subunit K
- External IDs: OMIM: 609596; MGI: 1921080; GeneCards: EIF3K
Available structures
PDB	Ortholog search: PDBe RCSB
PDB	List of PDB id codes 1RZ4, 3J8B, 3J8C

Gene location (Human)
Chr.	Chromosome 19 (human)
Band	19q13.2	Start	38,619,082 bp
Band	19q13.2	End	38,636,955 bp

Gene location (Mouse)
Chr.	Chromosome 7 (mouse)
Band	7|7 B1	Start	28,670,797 bp
Band	7|7 B1	End	28,681,289 bp
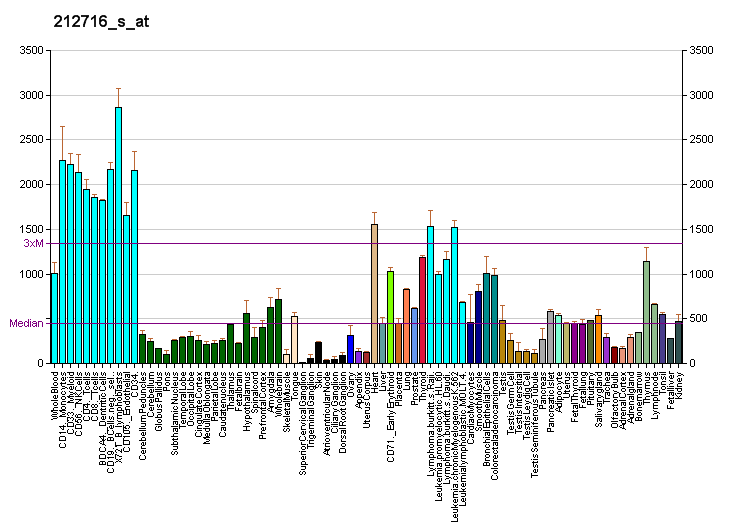

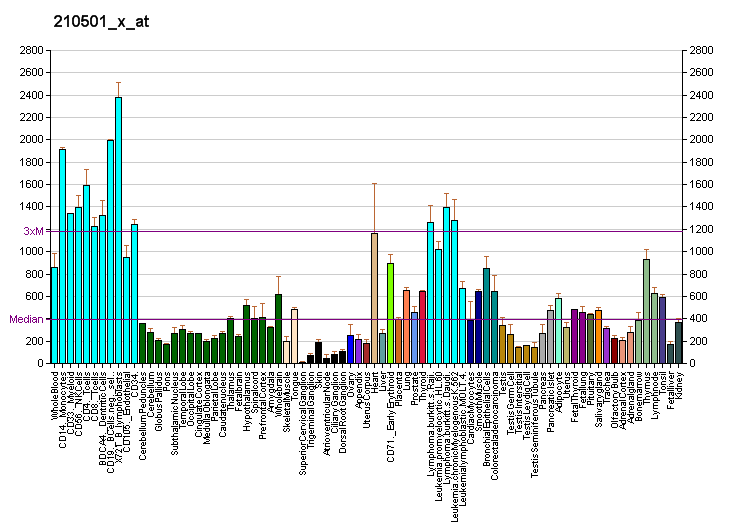

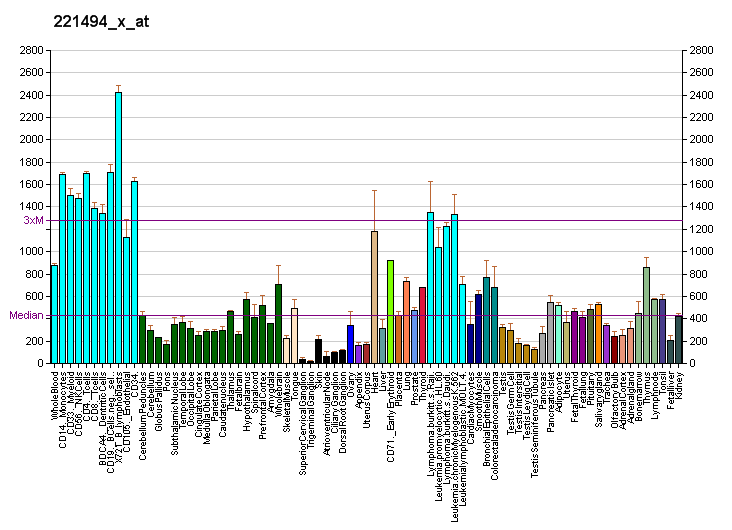
RNA expression pattern
Bgee	Human / Mouse (ortholog); Top expressed in: apex of heart; right auricle of heart; granulocyte; muscle of thigh; mucosa of transverse colon; muscle layer of sigmoid colon; rectum; body of stomach; skin of abdomen; monocyte / Top expressed in: maxillary prominence; mandibular prominence; epiblast; molar; embryo; embryo; fetal liver hematopoietic progenitor cell; ventricular zone; internal carotid artery; otic placode; More reference expression data
BioGPS	More reference expression data
Gene ontology
Molecular function	ribosome binding; protein binding; translation initiation factor activity; RNA binding
Cellular component	eukaryotic translation initiation factor 3 complex; extracellular exosome; membrane; nucleus; cytoplasm; cytosol; eukaryotic 43S preinitiation complex; eukaryotic 48S preinitiation complex
Biological process	translational initiation; regulation of translational initiation; protein biosynthesis; formation of cytoplasmic translation initiation complex; cytoplasmic translational initiation
Sources:Amigo / QuickGO
Orthologs
Databases	NCBI: entry; OMA: entry
Species	Human	Mouse
Entrez	27335	73830
Ensembl	ENSG00000178982; ENSG00000282986	ENSMUSG00000053565
UniProt	Q9UBQ5	Q9DBZ5
RefSeq (mRNA)	NM_001300992; NM_001308393; NM_013234	NM_001285942; NM_001285943; NM_028659
RefSeq (protein)	NP_001287921; NP_001295322; NP_037366	NP_001272871; NP_001272872; NP_082935
Location (UCSC)	Chr 19: 38.62 – 38.64 Mb	Chr 7: 28.67 – 28.68 Mb
PubMed search
- Wikidata
View/Edit Human	View/Edit Mouse

Eukaryotic translation initiation factor 3 subunit K (eIF3k) is a protein that in humans is encoded by the EIF3K gene.

== Function ==
The ~800 kDa eukaryotic initiation factor 3 (eIF3) is the largest eIF and contains at least 12 subunits, including eIF3k/EIF2S12. eIF3 plays an essential role in translation by binding directly to the 40S ribosomal subunit and promoting formation of the 43S preinitiation complex.

== Interactions ==
eIF3k has been shown to interact with Cyclin D3 and eIF3a.

== See also ==
- Eukaryotic initiation factor 3 (eIF3)
