= EIF3D =

Protein-coding gene in the species Homo sapiens

Identifiers
- Aliases: EIF3D, EIF3S7, eIF3-p66, eIF3-zeta, eukaryotic translation initiation factor 3 subunit D
- External IDs: OMIM: 603915; MGI: 1933181; GeneCards: EIF3D

Gene location (Human)
| Chr. | Chromosome 22 (human) |
| Band | 22q12.3 | Start | 36,510,855 bp |
| Band | 22q12.3 | End | 36,529,184 bp |

Gene location (Mouse)
| Chr. | Chromosome 15 (mouse) |
| Band | 15|15 E1 | Start | 77,843,198 bp |
| Band | 15|15 E1 | End | 77,855,013 bp |
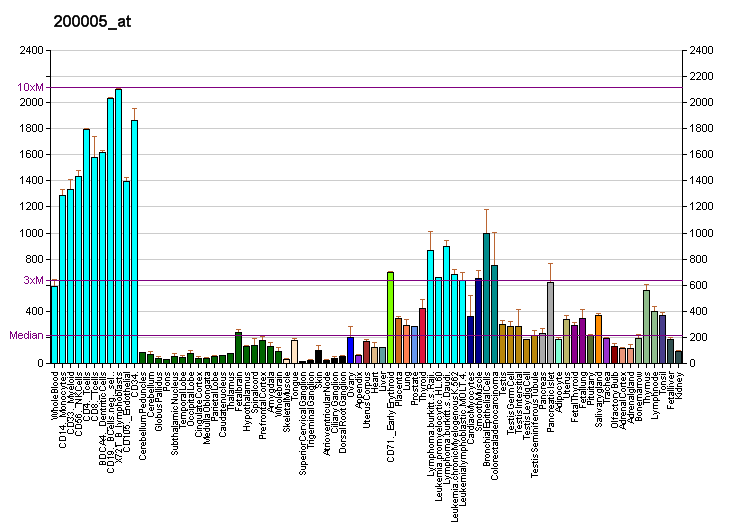
RNA expression pattern
| Bgee | Human / Mouse (ortholog); Top expressed in: body of pancreas; left ovary; skin of abdomen; skin of leg; epithelium of nasopharynx; parotid gland; right uterine tube; right ovary; spleen; body of stomach / Top expressed in: epiblast; mandibular prominence; somite; abdominal wall; maxillary prominence; fetal liver hematopoietic progenitor cell; human fetus; efferent ductule; endothelial cell of lymphatic vessel; ventricular zone; More reference expression data |
| BioGPS | More reference expression data |
Gene ontology
| Molecular function | protein binding; translation initiation factor activity; RNA binding; mRNA cap binding |
| Cellular component | cytoplasm; cytosol; eukaryotic translation initiation factor 3 complex, eIF3m; membrane; eukaryotic translation initiation factor 3 complex; eukaryotic 43S preinitiation complex; eukaryotic 48S preinitiation complex |
| Biological process | formation of cytoplasmic translation initiation complex; viral translational termination-reinitiation; translational initiation; protein biosynthesis; IRES-dependent viral translational initiation; cap-dependent translational initiation; positive regulation of translation; positive regulation of mRNA binding; cytoplasmic translational initiation |
Sources:Amigo / QuickGO
Orthologs
| Databases | NCBI: entry; OMA: entry |
| Species | Human | Mouse |
| Entrez | 8664 | 55944 |
| Ensembl | ENSG00000100353 | ENSMUSG00000016554 |
| UniProt | O15371 | O70194 |
| RefSeq (mRNA) | NM_003753 | NM_018749 |
| RefSeq (protein) | NP_003744 | NP_061219 |
| Location (UCSC) | Chr 22: 36.51 – 36.53 Mb | Chr 15: 77.84 – 77.86 Mb |
| PubMed search |
- Wikidata
| View/Edit Human | View/Edit Mouse |

Eukaryotic translation initiation factor 3 subunit D (eIF3d) is a protein that in humans is encoded by the EIF3D gene.

== Function ==
Eukaryotic translation initiation factor-3 (eIF3), the largest of the eIFs, is a multiprotein complex composed of at least ten nonidentical subunits. The complex binds to the 40S ribosome and helps maintain the 40S and 60S ribosomal subunits in a dissociated state. It is also thought to play a role in the formation of the 40S initiation complex by interacting with the ternary complex of eIF2/GTP/methionyl-tRNA, and by promoting mRNA binding. The protein encoded by this gene is the major RNA binding subunit of the eIF3 complex.

== Interactions ==
EIF3D has been shown to interact with PHLDA1 and EIF3A.

EIF3D has also been shown to interact with c-Jun mRNA via a non-canonical mechanism. Instead of the EIF4G protein acting as a cap-binding protein to mediate translation, EIF3D has been shown to be a cap binding protein for certain mRNAs such as c-Jun as detected by biochemical assays, although the structure of this complex (eIF3d-m7G cap) has not been resolved. c-Jun has structures at the 5' UTR inhibiting binding of EIF4G and promoting binding of EIF3D. EIF3D as a cap binding protein has been thought of as critical to regulating gene expression under cell stress such as during glucose deprivation. For translation of c-Jun under glucose starved conditions, the cap binding activity of EIF3D increased by 10-fold.. In addition, eIF3d can increase translation of capped mRNAs encoding matrix metalloproteinase 1 and cyclin-dependent kinase 12 by interacting with EIF4G2 (also known as DAP5.) in a subset of immune cells. eIF3d is also overexpressed in many cancer types, being involved in cell cycle regulation, and previous research demonstrated it can act as a N6-Methyladenosine reader on mRNAs.

== See also ==
- Eukaryotic initiation factor 3 (eIF3)
