= EIF4G =

Initiation factor 4G

Identifiers
- Symbol: IF4G
- InterPro: IPR045208
Available protein structures:
- PDB: IPR045208
- AlphaFold: IPR045208

Eukaryotic translation initiation factor 4 G (eIF4G) is a protein involved in eukaryotic translation initiation and is a component of the eIF4F cap-binding complex. Orthologs of eIF4G have been studied in multiple species, including humans, yeast, and wheat. However, eIF4G is exclusively found in domain Eukarya, and not in domains Bacteria or Archaea, which do not have capped mRNA. As such, eIF4G structure and function may vary between species, although the human EIF4G1 has been the focus of extensive studies. (Other human paralogs are EIF4G2 and EIF4G3.)

Across species, eIF4G strongly associates with eIF4E, the protein that directly binds the mRNA cap. Together with the RNA helicase protein eIF4A, these form the eIF4F complex.

Within the cell eIF4G is found primarily in the cytoplasm, usually bound to eIF4E; however, it is also found in the nucleus, where its function is unknown. It may have a role in nonsense-mediated decay.

== History ==
eIF4G stands for eukaryotic initiation factor 4 gamma (typically gamma is now replaced by G in the literature). It was initially isolated by fractionation, found present in fraction 4 gamma, and was involved in eukaryotic translation initiation.

== Binding partners ==
eIF4G has been found to associate with many other proteins besides those of the eIF4F complex, including MNK-1, CBP80, CBP20, PABP, and eIF3. eIF4G also directly binds mRNA and has multiple positively charged regions for this function. Several IRESs also bind eIF4G directly, as do BTE CITEs.

== In translation initiation ==
eIF4G is an important scaffold for the eIF4F complex and aids in recruiting the 40S ribosomal subunit to mRNA.

There are three mechanisms that the 40S ribosome can come to recognize the start codon: scanning, internal entry, and shunting. In scanning, the 40S ribosome slides along the RNA until it recognizes a start site (typically an AUG sequence in "good context"). In internal entry, the 40S ribosome does not start from the beginning (5' end) of the mRNA but instead starts from somewhere in the middle. In shunting, after the 40S ribosome starts sliding along the mRNA it "jumps" or skips large sections; the mechanism for this is still unclear. eIF4G is required for most types of initiation, except in special cases such as internal initiation at the HCV IRES or Cripavirus IRES.

eIF4G is an initiation factor involved in the assembly of the 43S and 48S translation initiation complex. This particular initiation factor binds to the PABPI (PolyA binding protein I), which is in turn binds the messenger RNA's poly(A) tail and eIF3, which is bound to the incoming small ribosomal subunit (40S).

== In disease ==
eIF4G has been implicated in breast cancer. It appears in increased levels in certain types of breast cancer and increases production of mRNAs that contain IRESs; these mRNAs produce hypoxia- and stress-related proteins that encourage blood vessel invasion (which is important for tumorigenesis).

== Role in aging ==
Regulation of translation initiation by eIF4G is vital for protein synthesis in developing organisms, for example yeast and nematodes. Deletion of eIF4G is lethal in yeast. In the roundworm C. elegans, knockout of eIF4G leads to animals that cannot develop past the early larval stage (L2) of development. The critical role of eIF4G in development appears to be reversed in adulthood, when eIF4G dysregulation negatively impacts lifespan and increases susceptibility to certain aging-related diseases (see eIF4G in diseases above). Inhibiting eIF4G during adulthood in C. elegans drastically extends lifespan, comparable to the lifespan increase exhibited during dietary restriction. In addition, inhibiting eIF4G reduces overall protein translation, while preferentially translating mRNA of genes important for responding to stress and against those associated with growth and reproduction. Thus eIF4G appears to control differential mRNA translation during periods or growth and stress, which may ultimately lead to age-related decline.

== Importance in virology ==
As previously mentioned, eIF4G is bound by certain IRESs, which were initially discovered in viruses. Some viral IRESs directly bind eIF4G and co-opt it to gain access to the ribosome. Some cellular mRNAs also contain IRESs (including eIF4G itself).

Some viral proteases cleave off part of eIF4G, that contains the eIF4E binding region. This has the effect of preventing most cellular mRNAs from binding eIF4G; however, a few cellular mRNAs with IRESs still translate under these conditions.

One example of an eIF4G binding site in a viral IRES is in the EMCV IRES (nucleotides 746–949).

== See also ==
- Eukaryotic initiation factors
- Eukaryotic initiation factor 4F (eIF4F)
