= Small nucleolar RNA SNORA63 =

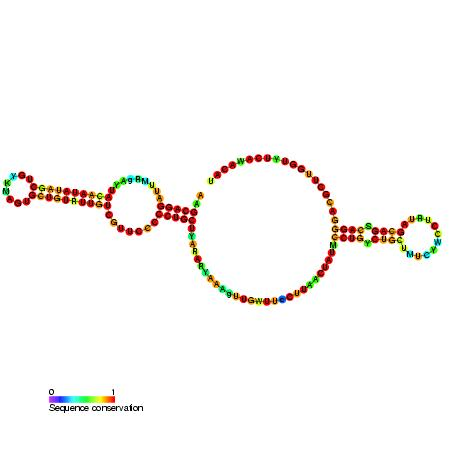
- Predicted secondary structure and sequence conservation of SNORA63

Identifiers
- Symbol: SNORA63
- Alt. Symbols: E3
- Rfam: RF00092

Other data
- RNA type: Gene; snRNA; snoRNA; HACA-box
- Domain: Eukaryota
- GO: GO:0006396 GO:0005730
- SO: SO:0000594
- PDB structures: PDBe

In molecular biology, Small nucleolar RNA SNORA63 (E3) is part of the H/ACA class of snoRNAs. It plays a role in the processing of eukaryotic pre-rRNA and has regions of complementarity to 18S rRNA. E3 is encoded within the introns of the gene for protein synthesis initiation factor 4AII.
