= EIF3A =

Protein-coding gene in the species Homo sapiens

Identifiers
- Aliases: EIF3A, EIF3, EIF3S10, P167, TIF32, eIF3-p170, eIF3-theta, p180, p185, eukaryotic translation initiation factor 3 subunit A
- External IDs: OMIM: 602039; MGI: 95301; GeneCards: EIF3A
Available structures
PDB	Ortholog search: PDBe RCSB
PDB	List of PDB id codes 3J8B, 3J8C

Gene location (Human)
Chr.	Chromosome 10 (human)
Band	10q26.11	Start	119,033,670 bp
Band	10q26.11	End	119,080,823 bp

Gene location (Mouse)
Chr.	Chromosome 19 (mouse)
Band	19|19 D3	Start	60,749,555 bp
Band	19|19 D3	End	60,779,096 bp
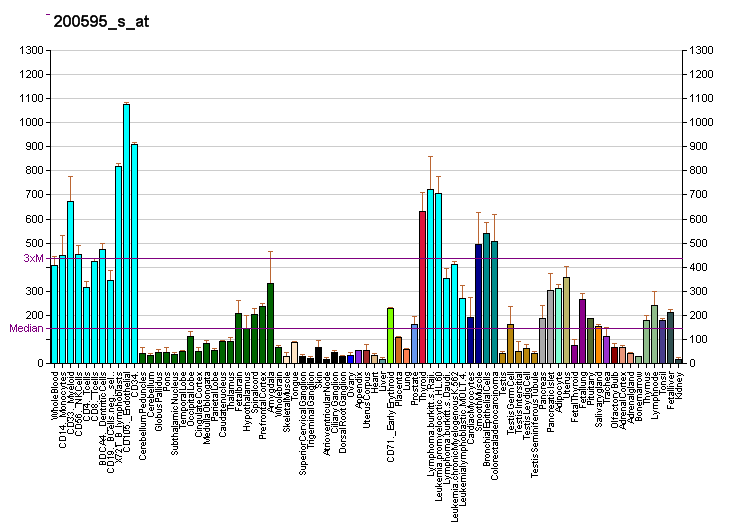

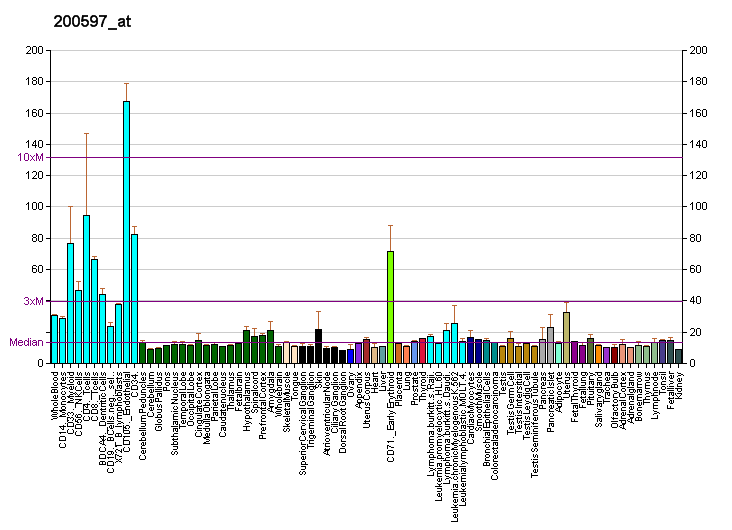

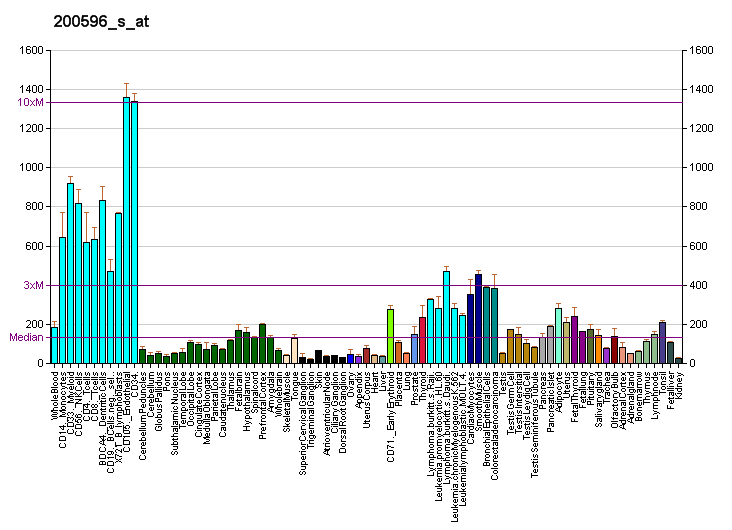
RNA expression pattern
Bgee	Human / Mouse (ortholog); Top expressed in: tendon of biceps brachii; tibia; buccal mucosa cell; amniotic fluid; epithelium of nasopharynx; gingival epithelium; skin of thigh; mucosa of paranasal sinus; skin of hip; glutes / Top expressed in: lacrimal gland; tail of embryo; maxillary prominence; mandibular prominence; otic placode; human fetus; saccule; primitive streak; hair follicle; seminal vesicula; More reference expression data
BioGPS	More reference expression data
Gene ontology
Molecular function	protein binding; structural molecule activity; translation initiation factor activity; receptor tyrosine kinase binding; RNA binding; mRNA binding
Cellular component	eukaryotic translation initiation factor 3 complex; nucleolus; nucleus; membrane; microtubule; cytoplasm; cytosol; multi-eIF complex; eukaryotic translation initiation factor 3 complex, eIF3e; eukaryotic translation initiation factor 3 complex, eIF3m; postsynaptic density; eukaryotic 43S preinitiation complex; eukaryotic 48S preinitiation complex
Biological process	translational initiation; formation of cytoplasmic translation initiation complex; viral translational termination-reinitiation; protein biosynthesis; IRES-dependent viral translational initiation; negative regulation of ERK1 and ERK2 cascade; translation reinitiation; cytoplasmic translational initiation
Sources:Amigo / QuickGO
Orthologs
Databases	NCBI: entry; OMA: entry
Species	Human	Mouse
Entrez	8661	13669
Ensembl	ENSG00000107581	ENSMUSG00000024991
UniProt	Q14152	P23116
RefSeq (mRNA)	NM_003750	NM_010123
RefSeq (protein)	NP_003741	NP_034253
Location (UCSC)	Chr 10: 119.03 – 119.08 Mb	Chr 19: 60.75 – 60.78 Mb
PubMed search
- Wikidata
View/Edit Human	View/Edit Mouse

Eukaryotic translation initiation factor 3 subunit A (eIF3a) is a protein that in humans is encoded by the EIF3A gene. It is one of the subunits of Eukaryotic initiation factor 3 (eIF3) a multiprotein complex playing major roles in translation initiation in eukaryotes.

== Interactions ==
EIF3A has been shown to interact with:

- DISC1,
- EIF3B,
- EIF3C,
- EIF3D,
- EIF3EIP,
- EIF3F,
- EIF3G,
- EIF3H,
- EIF3I
- EIF3J,
- EIF3K,
- EIF3S6,
- EIF4B,
- EIF4G2, and
- FBXO32.

== See also ==
- Eukaryotic initiation factor 3 (eIF3)
