= TGF beta 1 =

Protein-coding gene in the species Homo sapiens

TGFB1
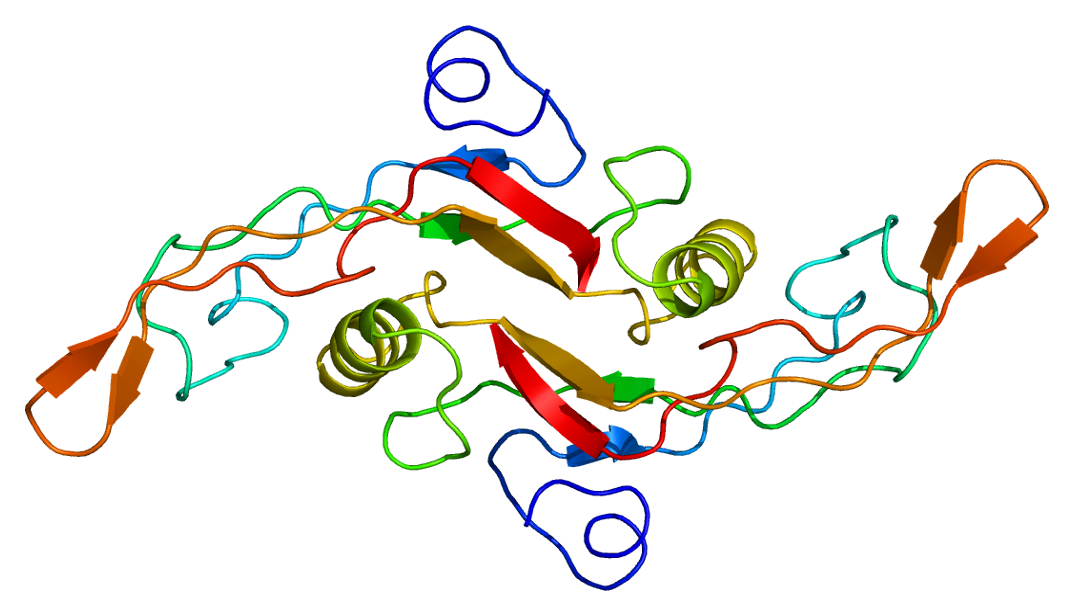

Identifiers
- Aliases: TGFB1, CED, DPD1, LAP, TGFB, TGFbeta, transforming growth factor beta 1, IBDIMDE, TGF-beta1
- External IDs: OMIM: 190180; MGI: 98725; GeneCards: TGFB1
Available structures
PDB	Ortholog search: PDBe RCSB
PDB	List of PDB id codes 1KLA, 1KLC, 1KLD, 3KFD, 4KV5

Gene location (Human)
Chr.	Chromosome 19 (human)
Band	19q13.2	Start	41,301,587 bp
Band	19q13.2	End	41,353,922 bp

Gene location (Mouse)
Chr.	Chromosome 7 (mouse)
Band	7 A3|7 13.98 cM	Start	25,386,427 bp
Band	7 A3|7 13.98 cM	End	25,404,502 bp
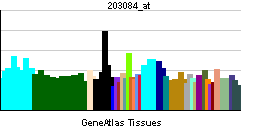

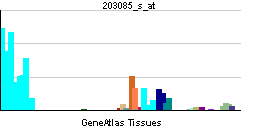
RNA expression pattern
Bgee	Human / Mouse (ortholog); Top expressed in: granulocyte; monocyte; stromal cell of endometrium; ascending aorta; Descending thoracic aorta; right coronary artery; spleen; right lung; canal of the cervix; blood / Top expressed in: molar; tibiofemoral joint; stroma of bone marrow; granulocyte; calvaria; mesenteric lymph nodes; spleen; lower jaw; thymus; body of femur; More reference expression data
BioGPS	More reference expression data
Gene ontology
Molecular function	type II transforming growth factor beta receptor binding; protein N-terminus binding; cytokine activity; enzyme binding; growth factor activity; antigen binding; type I transforming growth factor beta receptor binding; protein homodimerization activity; protein serine/threonine kinase activator activity; protein binding; protein heterodimerization activity; type III transforming growth factor beta receptor binding; transforming growth factor beta receptor binding; identical protein binding
Cellular component	cytoplasm; extracellular region; nucleus; microvillus; cell surface; blood microparticle; plasma membrane; secretory granule; axon; soma; Golgi lumen; platelet alpha granule lumen; extracellular matrix; extracellular space
Biological process	positive regulation of histone deacetylation; positive regulation of transcription regulatory region DNA binding; ureteric bud development; tolerance induction to self antigen; positive regulation of protein phosphorylation; endoderm development; response to cholesterol; positive regulation of MAP kinase activity; regulation of sodium ion transport; response to progesterone; negative regulation of cell cycle; response to organic substance; mammary gland development; T cell homeostasis; negative regulation of ossification; negative regulation of hyaluronan biosynthetic process; protein phosphorylation; T cell differentiation; positive regulation of vascular permeability; animal organ regeneration; positive regulation of blood vessel endothelial cell migration; negative regulation of epithelial cell proliferation; regulation of binding; inner ear development; myelination; negative regulation of macrophage cytokine production; cell population proliferation; transforming growth factor beta receptor signaling pathway; face morphogenesis; negative regulation of cell population proliferation; positive regulation of receptor clustering; regulation of apoptotic process; positive regulation of collagen biosynthetic process; cellular response to transforming growth factor beta stimulus; pathway-restricted SMAD protein phosphorylation; regulation of DNA binding; regulation of actin cytoskeleton reorganization; negative regulation of fat cell differentiation; positive regulation of protein metabolic process; cell-cell junction organization; negative regulation of myoblast differentiation; positive regulation of protein kinase B signaling; common-partner SMAD protein phosphorylation; positive regulation of branching involved in ureteric bud morphogenesis; SMAD protein signal transduction; epidermal growth factor receptor signaling pathway; macrophage derived foam cell differentiation; negative regulation of blood vessel endothelial cell migration; positive regulation of protein dephosphorylation; extrinsic apoptotic signaling pathway; negative regulation of extracellular matrix disassembly; mitotic cell cycle checkpoint signaling; positive regulation of fibroblast proliferation; negative regulation of cell differentiation; regulation of branching involved in mammary gland duct morphogenesis; positive regulation of exit from mitosis; negative regulation of transforming growth factor beta receptor signaling pathway; negative regulation of gene expression; morphogenesis of a branching structure; regulation of SMAD protein signal transduction; positive regulation of peptidyl-serine phosphorylation; cell activation; negative regulation of neuroblast proliferation; positive regulation of transcription, DNA-templated; cell growth; negative regulation of T cell proliferation; response to wounding; negative regulation of cell growth; positive regulation of chemotaxis; protein export from nucleus; regulation of protein import into nucleus; positive regulation of peptidyl-tyrosine phosphorylation; positive regulation of protein import into nucleus; positive regulation of cardiac muscle cell differentiation; oligodendrocyte development; positive regulation of interleukin-17 production; inflammatory response; negative regulation of interleukin-17 production; lymph node development; T cell activation; Notch signaling pathway; negative regulation of protein phosphorylation; regulation of blood vessel remodeling; SMAD protein complex assembly; regulation of striated muscle tissue development; response to vitamin D; chondrocyte differentiation; regulatory T cell differentiation; regulation of cartilage development; branch elongation involved in mammary gland duct branching; positive regulation of bone mineralization; positive regulation of epithelial cell proliferation; female pregnancy; cellular response to organic cyclic compound; positive regulation of extracellular matrix assembly; cellular calcium ion homeostasis; wound healing; negative regulation of transcription by RNA polymerase II; response to glucose; positive regulation of epithelial to mesenchymal transition; cellular response to dexamethasone stimulus; negative regulation of production of miRNAs involved in gene silencing by miRNA; mitigation of host defenses by virus; lens fiber cell differentiation; positive regulation of NF-kappaB transcription factor activity; extracellular matrix assembly; ATP biosynthetic process; hematopoietic progenitor cell differentiation; regulation of interleukin-23 production; positive regulation of protein secretion; frontal suture morphogenesis; epithelial to mesenchymal transition; phosphate-containing compound metabolic process; regulation of gene expression; adaptive immune response based on somatic recombination of immune receptors built from immunoglobulin superfamily domains; negative regulation of release of sequestered calcium ion into cytosol; response to radiation; mononuclear cell proliferation; negative regulation of transcription, DNA-templated; negative regulation of T cell activation; positive regulation of odontogenesis; lipopolysaccharide-mediated signaling pathway; positive regulation of protein localization to nucleus; response to estradiol; regulation of cell migration; response to hypoxia; hyaluronan catabolic process; negative regulation of phagocytosis; response to organic cyclic compound; positive regulation of protein-containing complex assembly; protein kinase B signaling; negative regulation of cell-cell adhesion; negative regulation of gene silencing by miRNA; positive regulation of regulatory T cell differentiation; cellular response to growth factor stimulus; positive regulation of pathway-restricted SMAD protein phosphorylation; mammary gland branching involved in thelarche; response to laminar fluid shear stress; ageing; regulation of regulatory T cell differentiation; platelet degranulation; negative regulation of DNA replication; myeloid dendritic cell differentiation; salivary gland morphogenesis; receptor catabolic process; MAPK cascade; positive regulation of histone acetylation; regulation of transforming growth factor beta receptor signaling pathway; positive regulation of phosphatidylinositol 3-kinase activity; negative regulation of protein localization to plasma membrane; positive regulation of NAD+ ADP-ribosyltransferase activity; negative regulation of immune response; regulation of cell population proliferation; negative regulation of skeletal muscle tissue development; positive regulation of peptidyl-threonine phosphorylation; positive regulation of smooth muscle cell differentiation; positive regulation of isotype switching to IgA isotypes; connective tissue replacement involved in inflammatory response wound healing; ossification involved in bone remodeling; positive regulation of apoptotic process; positive regulation of vascular endothelial growth factor production; positive regulation of superoxide anion generation; digestive tract development; cell migration; positive regulation of fibroblast migration; positive regulation of cell division; germ cell migration; positive regulation of transcription by RNA polymerase II; negative regulation of mitotic cell cycle; positive regulation of SMAD protein signal transduction; positive regulation of pri-miRNA transcription by RNA polymerase II; positive regulation of gene expression; positive regulation of cell population proliferation; liver regeneration; regulation of epithelial to mesenchymal transition involved in endocardial cushion formation; positive regulation of mononuclear cell migration; cellular response to insulin-like growth factor stimulus; positive regulation of cell migration; response to immobilization stress; cellular response to mechanical stimulus; cellular response to ionizing radiation; vasculogenesis; neural tube closure; heart valve morphogenesis; development of the heart; neural tube development; membrane protein intracellular domain proteolysis; leukocyte migration; ventricular cardiac muscle tissue morphogenesis; positive regulation of ERK1 and ERK2 cascade; transforming growth factor beta receptor signaling pathway involved in heart development; embryonic liver development; BMP signaling pathway; cell development; apoptotic process; regulation of pri-miRNA transcription by RNA polymerase II; positive regulation of production of miRNAs involved in gene silencing by miRNA; regulation of signaling receptor activity
Sources:Amigo / QuickGO
Orthologs
Databases	NCBI: entry; OMA: entry
Species	Human	Mouse
Entrez	7040	21803
Ensembl	ENSG00000105329	ENSMUSG00000002603
UniProt	P01137	P04202
RefSeq (mRNA)	NM_000660	NM_011577
RefSeq (protein)	NP_000651	NP_035707
Location (UCSC)	Chr 19: 41.3 – 41.35 Mb	Chr 7: 25.39 – 25.4 Mb
PubMed search
- Wikidata
View/Edit Human	View/Edit Mouse

Transforming growth factor beta 1 or TGF-β1 is a polypeptide member of the transforming growth factor beta superfamily of cytokines. It is a secreted protein that performs many cellular functions, including the control of cell growth, cell proliferation, cell differentiation, and apoptosis. In humans, TGF-β1 is encoded by the TGFB1 gene.

== Function ==
TGF-β is a multifunctional set of peptides that controls proliferation, differentiation, and other functions in many cell types. TGF-β acts synergistically with transforming growth factor-alpha (TGF-α) in inducing transformation. It also acts as a negative autocrine growth factor. Dysregulation of TGF-β activation and signaling may result in apoptosis. Many cells synthesize TGF-β and almost all of them have specific receptors for this peptide. TGF-β1, TGF-β2, and TGF-β3 all function through the same receptor signaling systems.

TGF-β1 was first identified in human platelets as a protein with a molecular mass of 25 kilodaltons with a potential role in wound healing. It was later characterized as a large protein precursor (containing 390 amino acids) that was proteolytically processed to produce a mature peptide of 112 amino acids.

TGF-β1 plays an important role in controlling the immune system, and shows different activities on different types of cell, or cells at different developmental stages. Most immune cells (or leukocytes) secrete TGF-β1.

=== T cells ===
Some T cells (e.g. regulatory T cells) release TGF-β1 to inhibit the actions of other T cells. Specifically, TGF-β1 prevents the interleukin(IL)-1- & interleukin-2-dependent proliferation in activated T cells, as well as the activation of quiescent helper T cells and cytotoxic T cells. Similarly, TGF-β1 can inhibit the secretion and activity of many other cytokines including interferon-γ, tumor necrosis factor-alpha (TNF-α), and various interleukins. It can also decrease the expression levels of cytokine receptors, such as the IL-2 receptor to down-regulate the activity of immune cells. However, TGF-β1 can also increase the expression of certain cytokines in T cells and promote their proliferation, particularly if the cells are immature.

=== B cells ===
TGF-β1 has similar effects on B cells that also vary according to the differentiation state of the cell. It inhibits proliferation, stimulates apoptosis of B cells, and controls the expression of antibody, transferrin and MHC class II proteins on immature and mature B cells.

=== Myeloid cells ===
The effects of TGF-β1 on macrophages and monocytes are predominantly suppressive; this cytokine can inhibit the proliferation of these cells and prevent their production of reactive oxygen (e.g. superoxide (O_{2}^{−})) and nitrogen (e.g. nitric oxide (NO)) intermediates. However, as with other cell types, TGF-β1 can also have the opposite effect on cells of myeloid origin. For example, TGF-β1 acts as a chemoattractant, directing an immune response to certain pathogens. Likewise, macrophages and monocytes respond to low levels of TGF-β1 in a chemotactic manner. Furthermore, the expression of monocytic cytokines (such as interleukin(IL)-1α, IL-1β, and TNF-α), and macrophage's phagocytic can be increased by the action of TGF-β1.

TGF-β1 reduces the efficacy of the MHC II in astrocytes and dendritic cells, which in turn decreases the activation of appropriate helper T cell populations.

== Interactions ==
TGF beta 1 has been shown to interact with:

- Decorin,
- EIF3I
- LTBP1,
- TGF beta receptor 1, and
- YWHAE.
