= EIF3H =

Protein-coding gene in the species Homo sapiens

Identifiers
- Aliases: EIF3H, EIF3S3, eIF3-gamma, eIF3-p40, eukaryotic translation initiation factor 3 subunit H
- External IDs: OMIM: 603912; MGI: 1915385; GeneCards: EIF3H
Available structures
PDB	Ortholog search: PDBe RCSB
PDB	List of PDB id codes 3J8B, 3J8C

Gene location (Human)
Chr.	Chromosome 8 (human)
Band	8q23.3-q24.11	Start	116,642,130 bp
Band	8q23.3-q24.11	End	116,766,925 bp

Gene location (Mouse)
Chr.	Chromosome 15 (mouse)
Band	15|15 C	Start	51,649,954 bp
Band	15|15 C	End	51,728,919 bp
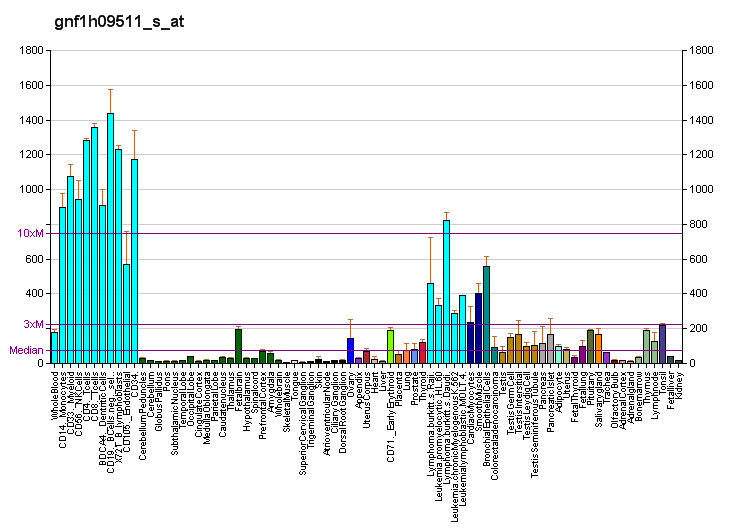

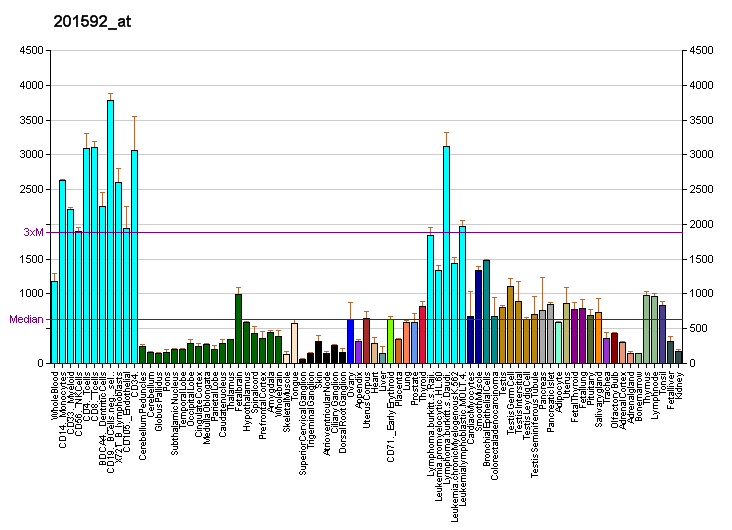
RNA expression pattern
Bgee	Human / Mouse (ortholog); Top expressed in: ganglionic eminence; gonad; left ovary; parotid gland; monocyte; right ovary; body of uterus; canal of the cervix; lymph node; ectocervix / Top expressed in: neural layer of retina; yolk sac; ventricular zone; tail of embryo; genital tubercle; lip; morula; dentate gyrus of hippocampal formation granule cell; embryo; muscle of thigh; More reference expression data
BioGPS	More reference expression data
Gene ontology
Molecular function	protein binding; translation initiation factor activity; RNA binding; metallopeptidase activity
Cellular component	cytoplasm; cytosol; eukaryotic translation initiation factor 3 complex; eukaryotic translation initiation factor 3 complex, eIF3m; extracellular exosome; membrane; eukaryotic 43S preinitiation complex; eukaryotic 48S preinitiation complex; polysomal ribosome
Biological process	translational initiation; regulation of translational initiation; protein biosynthesis; formation of cytoplasmic translation initiation complex; cytoplasmic translational initiation; proteolysis
Sources:Amigo / QuickGO
Orthologs
Databases	NCBI: entry; OMA: entry
Species	Human	Mouse
Entrez	8667	68135
Ensembl	ENSG00000147677	ENSMUSG00000022312
UniProt	O15372	Q91WK2
RefSeq (mRNA)	NM_003756	NM_080635
RefSeq (protein)	NP_003747	NP_542366
Location (UCSC)	Chr 8: 116.64 – 116.77 Mb	Chr 15: 51.65 – 51.73 Mb
PubMed search
- Wikidata
View/Edit Human	View/Edit Mouse

Eukaryotic translation initiation factor 3 subunit H (eIF3h) is a protein that in humans is encoded by the EIF3H gene.

== Interactions ==
eIF3h has been shown to interact with eIF3a.

== See also ==
- Eukaryotic initiation factor 3 (eIF3)
