= EIF3G =

Protein-coding gene in the species Homo sapiens

Identifiers
- Aliases: EIF3G, EIF3-P42, EIF3S4, eIF3-delta, eIF3-p44, eukaryotic translation initiation factor 3 subunit G
- External IDs: OMIM: 603913; MGI: 1858258; GeneCards: EIF3G
Available structures
PDB	Ortholog search: PDBe RCSB
PDB	List of PDB id codes 2CQ0, 2MJC, 5K0Y

Gene location (Human)
Chr.	Chromosome 19 (human)
Band	19p13.2	Start	10,115,014 bp
Band	19p13.2	End	10,119,918 bp

Gene location (Mouse)
Chr.	Chromosome 9 (mouse)
Band	9|9 A3	Start	20,805,645 bp
Band	9|9 A3	End	20,809,919 bp
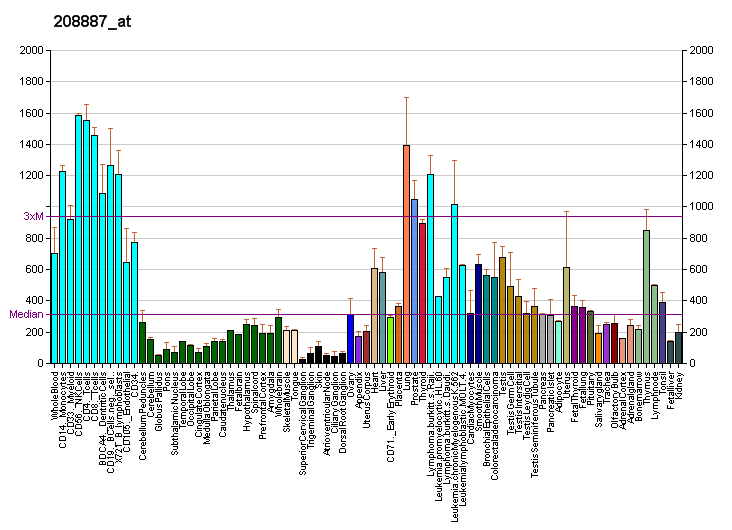
RNA expression pattern
Bgee	Human / Mouse (ortholog); Top expressed in: granulocyte; body of pancreas; left ovary; left testis; right testis; gastrocnemius muscle; right ovary; canal of the cervix; body of stomach; Achilles tendon / Top expressed in: primitive streak; mandibular prominence; Gonadal ridge; maxillary prominence; vas deferens; condyle; hair follicle; abdominal wall; epiblast; medullary collecting duct; More reference expression data
BioGPS	More reference expression data
Gene ontology
Molecular function	protein binding; translation initiation factor activity; nucleic acid binding; RNA binding
Cellular component	cytoplasm; perinuclear region of cytoplasm; eukaryotic translation initiation factor 3 complex; nucleus; cytosol; eukaryotic 43S preinitiation complex; eukaryotic 48S preinitiation complex
Biological process	translational initiation; viral translational termination-reinitiation; protein biosynthesis; formation of cytoplasmic translation initiation complex; cytoplasmic translational initiation
Sources:Amigo / QuickGO
Orthologs
Databases	NCBI: entry; OMA: entry
Species	Human	Mouse
Entrez	8666	53356
Ensembl	ENSG00000130811	ENSMUSG00000070319
UniProt	O75821	Q9Z1D1
RefSeq (mRNA)	NM_003755	NM_016876
RefSeq (protein)	NP_003746	NP_058572
Location (UCSC)	Chr 19: 10.12 – 10.12 Mb	Chr 9: 20.81 – 20.81 Mb
PubMed search
- Wikidata
View/Edit Human	View/Edit Mouse

Eukaryotic translation initiation factor 3 subunit G (eIF3g) is a protein that in humans is encoded by the EIF3G gene.

== Interactions ==
EIF3G has been shown to interact with Band 4.1, EIF3C and EIF3A.

== See also ==
- Eukaryotic initiation factor 3 (eIF3)
