= Eukaryotic initiation factor =

Protein involved in gene expression

Eukaryotic initiation factors (eIFs) are proteins or protein complexes involved in the initiation phase of eukaryotic translation. These proteins help stabilize the formation of ribosomal preinitiation complexes around the start codon and are an important input for post-transcription gene regulation. Several initiation factors form a complex with the small 40S ribosomal subunit and Met-tRNA_{i}^{Met} called the 43S preinitiation complex (43S PIC). Additional factors of the eIF4F complex (eIF4A, E, and G) recruit the 43S PIC to the five-prime cap structure of the mRNA, from which the 43S particle scans 5'-->3' along the mRNA to reach an AUG start codon. Recognition of the start codon by the Met-tRNA_{i}^{Met} promotes gated phosphate and eIF1 release to form the 48S preinitiation complex (48S PIC), followed by large 60S ribosomal subunit recruitment to form the 80S ribosome. There exist many more eukaryotic initiation factors than prokaryotic initiation factors, reflecting the greater biological complexity of eukaryotic translation. There are at least twelve eukaryotic initiation factors, composed of many more polypeptides, and these are described below.

== eIF1 and eIF1A ==
eIF1 and eIF1A both bind to the 40S ribosome subunit-mRNA complex. Together they induce an "open" conformation of the mRNA binding channel, which is crucial for scanning, tRNA delivery, and start codon recognition. In particular, eIF1 dissociation from the 40S subunit is considered to be a key step in start codon recognition. eIF1 and eIF1A are small proteins (13 and 16 kDa, respectively in humans) and are both components of the 43S PIC. eIF1 binds near the ribosomal P-site, while eIF1A binds near the A-site, in a manner similar to the structurally and functionally related bacterial counterparts IF3 and IF1, respectively.

== eIF2 ==
eIF2 is the main protein complex responsible for delivering the initiator tRNA to the P-site of the preinitiation complex, as a ternary complex containing Met-tRNA_{i}^{Met} and GTP (the eIF2-TC). eIF2 has specificity for the methionine-charged initiator tRNA, which is distinct from other methionine-charged tRNAs used for elongation of the polypeptide chain. The eIF2 ternary complex remains bound to the P-site while the mRNA attaches to the 40s ribosome and the complex begins to scan the mRNA. Once the AUG start codon is recognized and located in the P-site, eIF5 stimulates the hydrolysis of eIF2-GTP, effectively switching it to the GDP-bound form via gated phosphate release. The hydrolysis of eIF2-GTP provides the conformational change to change the scanning complex into the 48S Initiation complex with the initiator tRNA-Met anticodon base paired to the AUG. After the initiation complex is formed the 60s subunit joins and eIF2 along with most of the initiation factors dissociate from the complex allowing the 60S subunit to bind. eIF1A and eIF5B-GTP remain bound to one another in the A site and must be hydrolyzed to be released and properly initiate elongation.

eIF2 has three subunits, eIF2-α, β, and γ. The former α-subunit is a target of regulatory phosphorylation and is of particular importance for cells that may need to turn off protein synthesis globally as a response to cell signaling events. When phosphorylated, it sequesters eIF2B (not to be confused with eIF2β), a GEF. Without this GEF, GDP cannot be exchanged for GTP, and translation is repressed. One example of this is the eIF2α-induced translation repression that occurs in reticulocytes when starved for iron. In the case of viral infection, protein kinase R (PKR) phosphorylates eIF2α when dsRNA is detected in many multicellular organisms, leading to cell death.

The proteins eIF2A and eIF2D are both technically named 'eIF2' but neither are part of the eIF2 heterotrimer and they seem to play unique functions in translation. Instead, they appear to be involved in specialized pathways, such as 'eIF2-independent' translation initiation or re-initiation, respectively.

== eIF3 ==
eIF3 independently binds the 40S ribosomal subunit, multiple initiation factors, and cellular and viral mRNA.

In mammals, eIF3 is the largest initiation factor, made up of 13 subunits (a-m). It has a molecular weight of ~800 kDa and controls the assembly of the 40S ribosomal subunit on mRNA that have a 5' cap or an IRES. eIF3 may use the eIF4F complex, or alternatively during internal initiation, an IRES, to position the mRNA strand near the exit site of the 40S ribosomal subunit, thus promoting the assembly of a functional pre-initiation complex.

In many human cancers, eIF3 subunits are overexpressed (subunits a, b, c, h, i, and m) and underexpressed (subunits e and f). One potential mechanism to explain this disregulation comes from the finding that eIF3 binds a specific set of cell proliferation regulator mRNA transcripts and regulates their translation. eIF3 also mediates cellular signaling through S6K1 and mTOR/Raptor to effect translational regulation.

== eIF4 ==
The eIF4F complex is composed of three subunits: eIF4A, eIF4E, and eIF4G. Each subunit has multiple human isoforms and there exist additional eIF4 proteins: eIF4B and eIF4H.

eIF4G is a 175.5-kDa scaffolding protein that interacts with eIF3 and the Poly(A)-binding protein (PABP), as well as the other members of the eIF4F complex. eIF4E recognizes and binds to the 5' cap structure of mRNA, while eIF4G binds PABP, which binds the poly(A) tail, potentially circularizing and activating the bound mRNA. eIF4A – a DEAD box RNA helicase – is important for resolving mRNA secondary structures.

eIF4B contains two RNA-binding domains – one non-specifically interacts with mRNA, whereas the second specifically binds the 18S portion of the small ribosomal subunit. It acts as an anchor, as well as a critical co-factor for eIF4A. It is also a substrate of S6K, and when phosphorylated, it promotes the formation of the pre-initiation complex. In vertebrates, eIF4H is an additional initiation factor with similar function to eIF4B.

== eIF5, eIF5A and eIF5B ==
eIF5 is a GTPase-activating protein, which helps the large ribosomal subunit associate with the small subunit. It is required for GTP-hydrolysis by eIF2.

eIF5A is the eukaryotic homolog of EF-P. It helps with elongation and also plays a role in termination. EIF5A contains the unusual amino acid hypusine.

eIF5B is a GTPase, and is involved in assembly of the full ribosome. It is the functional eukaryotic analog of bacterial IF2.

== eIF6 ==
eIF6 performs the same inhibition of ribosome assembly as eIF3, but binds with the large subunit.

== See also ==
- Eukaryotic translation
- Ded1/DDX3
- DHX29
