= EIF3E =

Protein-coding gene in the species Homo sapiens

Identifiers
- Aliases: EIF3E, EIF3-P48, EIF3S6, INT6, eIF3-p46, eukaryotic translation initiation factor 3 subunit E
- External IDs: OMIM: 602210; MGI: 99257; GeneCards: EIF3E
Available structures
PDB	Ortholog search: PDBe RCSB
PDB	List of PDB id codes 3J8B, 3J8C, 5A5T

Gene location (Human)
Chr.	Chromosome 8 (human)
Band	8q23.1	Start	108,162,787 bp
Band	8q23.1	End	108,443,496 bp

Gene location (Mouse)
Chr.	Chromosome 15 (mouse)
Band	15 B3.2|15 16.73 cM	Start	43,113,454 bp
Band	15 B3.2|15 16.73 cM	End	43,146,115 bp
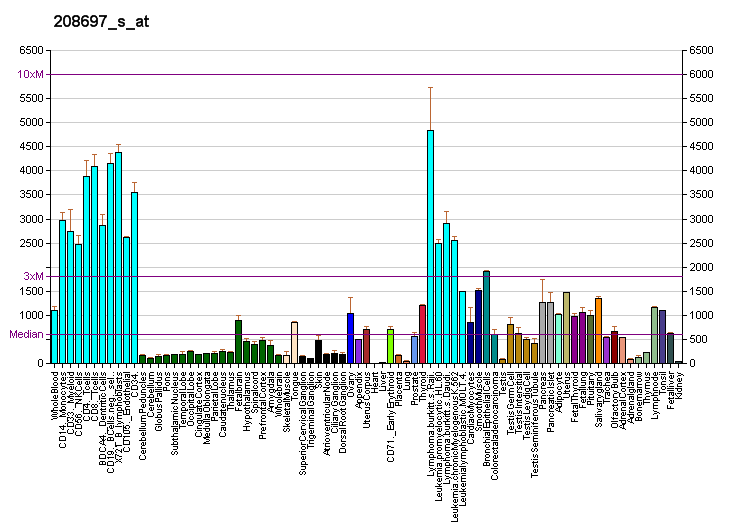
RNA expression pattern
Bgee	Human / Mouse (ortholog); Top expressed in: Achilles tendon; tendon of biceps brachii; parietal pleura; ovary; germinal epithelium; left ovary; ganglionic eminence; skin of thigh; skin of hip; body of pancreas / Top expressed in: vestibular sensory epithelium; primitive streak; maxillary prominence; mandibular prominence; hair follicle; medial ganglionic eminence; abdominal wall; endothelial cell of lymphatic vessel; efferent ductule; vas deferens; More reference expression data
BioGPS	More reference expression data
Gene ontology
Molecular function	translation initiation factor activity; protein N-terminus binding; protein binding; RNA binding; cadherin binding
Cellular component	cytoplasm; eukaryotic translation initiation factor 3 complex; PML body; membrane; nucleoplasm; chromatin; extracellular exosome; nucleus; cytosol; nuclear body; eukaryotic 43S preinitiation complex; eukaryotic 48S preinitiation complex; eukaryotic translation initiation factor 3 complex, eIF3e
Biological process	negative regulation of translational initiation; translational initiation; nuclear-transcribed mRNA catabolic process, nonsense-mediated decay; protein biosynthesis; regulation of translational initiation; positive regulation of translation; positive regulation of mRNA binding; formation of cytoplasmic translation initiation complex; cytoplasmic translational initiation
Sources:Amigo / QuickGO
Orthologs
Databases	NCBI: entry; OMA: entry
Species	Human	Mouse
Entrez	3646	16341
Ensembl	ENSG00000104408	ENSMUSG00000022336
UniProt	P60228	P60229
RefSeq (mRNA)	NM_001568	NM_008388
RefSeq (protein)	NP_001559	NP_032414
Location (UCSC)	Chr 8: 108.16 – 108.44 Mb	Chr 15: 43.11 – 43.15 Mb
PubMed search
- Wikidata
View/Edit Human	View/Edit Mouse

Eukaryotic translation initiation factor 3 subunit E (eIF3e) is a protein that in humans is encoded by the EIF3E gene.

== Interactions ==
EIF3S6 has been shown to interact with:

- BAT2,
- COPS6
- CSN3,
- EIF3A, and
- TRIM27.

== See also ==
- Eukaryotic initiation factor 3 (eIF3)
