= EIF3C =

Protein-coding gene in the species Homo sapiens

Identifiers
- Aliases: EIF3C, EIF3CL, EIF3S8, eIF3-p110, eukaryotic translation initiation factor 3 subunit C
- External IDs: OMIM: 603916; MGI: 1926966; GeneCards: EIF3C
Available structures
| PDB | Ortholog search: PDBe RCSB |
| PDB | List of PDB id codes 3J8B, 3J8C |

Gene location (Human)
| Chr. | Chromosome 16 (human) |
| Band | 16p11.2 | Start | 28,688,558 bp |
| Band | 16p11.2 | End | 28,735,727 bp |

Gene location (Mouse)
| Chr. | Chromosome 7 (mouse) |
| Band | 7 69.14 cM|7 F3 | Start | 126,145,627 bp |
| Band | 7 69.14 cM|7 F3 | End | 126,165,583 bp |
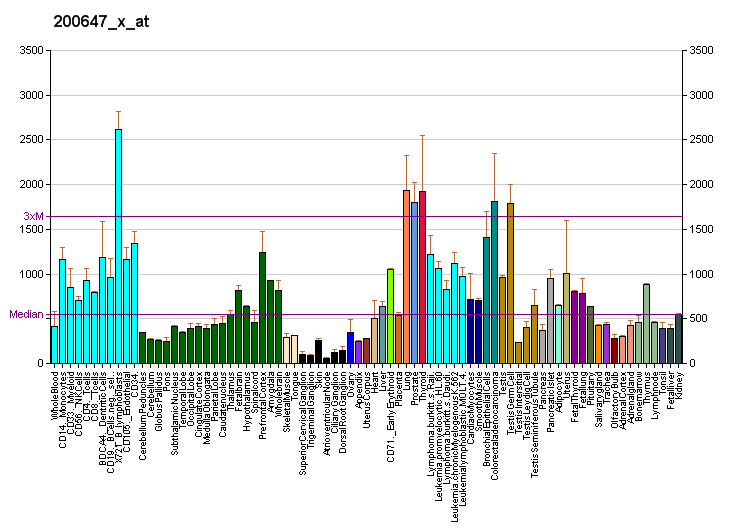

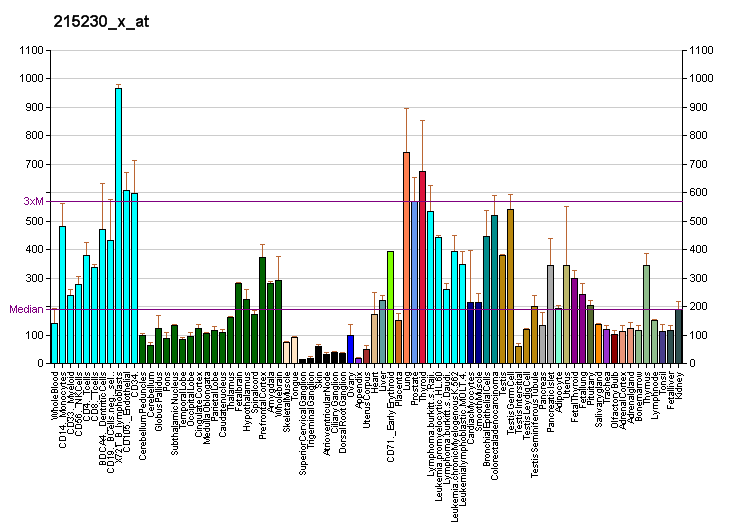

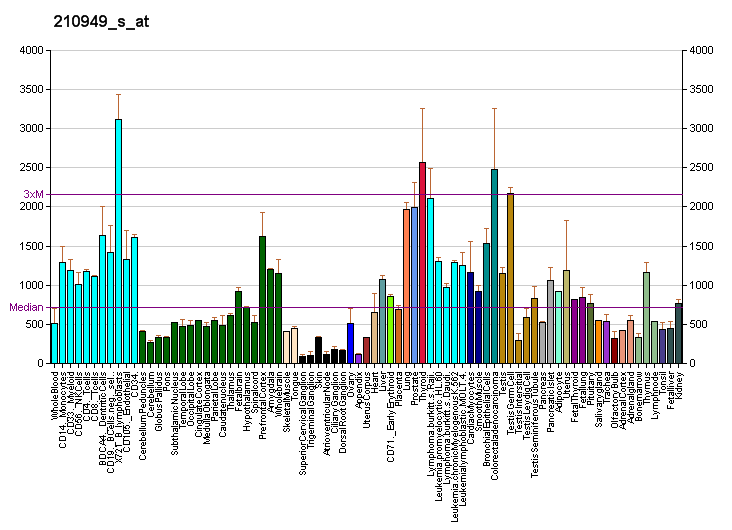
RNA expression pattern
| Bgee | Human / Mouse (ortholog); Top expressed in: right uterine tube; left testis; ganglionic eminence; olfactory zone of nasal mucosa; right lobe of thyroid gland; body of pancreas; right testis; left lobe of thyroid gland; anterior pituitary; Brodmann area 9 / Top expressed in: tail of embryo; genital tubercle; mandibular prominence; maxillary prominence; somite; endothelial cell of lymphatic vessel; Gonadal ridge; hair follicle; primitive streak; dermis; More reference expression data |
| BioGPS | More reference expression data |
Gene ontology
| Molecular function | translation initiation factor binding; protein binding; translation initiation factor activity; RNA binding |
| Cellular component | cytoplasm; cytosol; eukaryotic translation initiation factor 3 complex; eukaryotic 43S preinitiation complex; eukaryotic 48S preinitiation complex |
| Biological process | translational initiation; protein biosynthesis; positive regulation of translation; positive regulation of mRNA binding; formation of cytoplasmic translation initiation complex; cytoplasmic translational initiation |
Sources:Amigo / QuickGO
Orthologs
| Databases | NCBI: entry; OMA: entry |
| Species | Human | Mouse |
| Entrez | 8663 | 56347 |
| Ensembl | ENSG00000184110 | ENSMUSG00000030738 |
| UniProt | Q99613 | Q8R1B4 |
| RefSeq (mRNA) | NM_003752; NM_001037808; NM_001199142; NM_001267574; NM_001286478 | NM_146200 |
| RefSeq (protein) | NP_001032897; NP_001186071; NP_001254503; NP_001273407; NP_003743 | NP_666312 |
| Location (UCSC) | Chr 16: 28.69 – 28.74 Mb | Chr 7: 126.15 – 126.17 Mb |
| PubMed search |
- Wikidata
| View/Edit Human | View/Edit Mouse |

Eukaryotic translation initiation factor 3 subunit C (eIF3c) is a protein that in humans is encoded by the EIF3C gene.

== Interactions ==
EIF3C has been shown to interact with EIF3G and EIF3A.

== See also ==
- Eukaryotic initiation factor 3 (eIF3)
