= EIF3M =

Protein-coding gene in the species Homo sapiens

Identifiers
- Aliases: EIF3M, B5, PCID1, TANGO7, hfl-B5, GA17, eukaryotic translation initiation factor 3 subunit M
- External IDs: OMIM: 609641; MGI: 1351744; GeneCards: EIF3M
Available structures
PDB	Ortholog search: PDBe RCSB
PDB	List of PDB id codes 3J8B, 3J8C, 5A5T

Gene location (Human)
Chr.	Chromosome 11 (human)
Band	11p13	Start	32,583,798 bp
Band	11p13	End	32,606,264 bp

Gene location (Mouse)
Chr.	Chromosome 2 (mouse)
Band	2 E2|2 55.06 cM	Start	104,830,001 bp
Band	2 E2|2 55.06 cM	End	104,847,425 bp
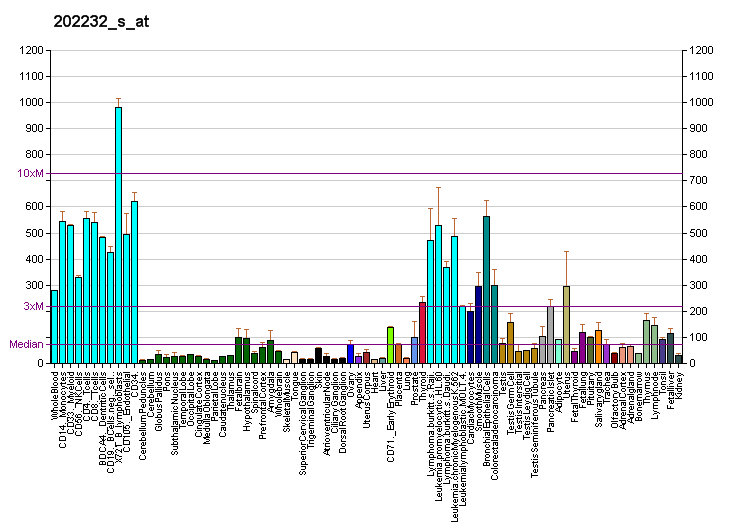

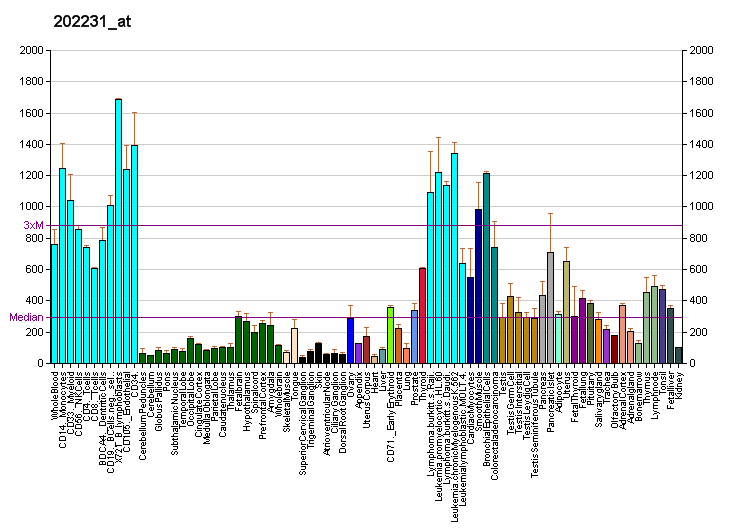
RNA expression pattern
Bgee	Human / Mouse (ortholog); Top expressed in: germinal epithelium; superficial temporal artery; parietal pleura; body of pancreas; ganglionic eminence; left ovary; oral cavity; monocyte; epithelium of nasopharynx; endometrium / Top expressed in: epiblast; ovary; pancreas; embryo; ventricular zone; ganglionic eminence; embryo; islet of Langerhans; uterus; spermatocyte; More reference expression data
BioGPS	More reference expression data
Gene ontology
Molecular function	translation initiation factor binding; protein binding; translation initiation factor activity
Cellular component	cytoplasm; eukaryotic translation initiation factor 3 complex; cytosol; eukaryotic translation initiation factor 3 complex, eIF3m; eukaryotic 43S preinitiation complex; eukaryotic 48S preinitiation complex
Biological process	translational initiation; cytoplasmic translational initiation; protein biosynthesis; formation of cytoplasmic translation initiation complex
Sources:Amigo / QuickGO
Orthologs
Databases	NCBI: entry; OMA: entry
Species	Human	Mouse
Entrez	10480	98221
Ensembl	ENSG00000149100	ENSMUSG00000027170
UniProt	Q7L2H7	Q99JX4
RefSeq (mRNA)	NM_001307929; NM_006360	NM_145380
RefSeq (protein)	NP_001294858; NP_006351	NP_663355
Location (UCSC)	Chr 11: 32.58 – 32.61 Mb	Chr 2: 104.83 – 104.85 Mb
PubMed search
- Wikidata
View/Edit Human	View/Edit Mouse

Eukaryotic translation initiation factor 3, subunit M (eIF3m) also known as PCI domain containing 1 (herpesvirus entry mediator) (PCID1), is a protein that in humans is encoded by the EIF3M gene.

HFLB5 encodes a broadly expressed protein containing putative membrane fusion domains that acts as a receptor or coreceptor for entry of herpes simplex virus (HSV).

== See also ==
- Eukaryotic initiation factor 3 (eIF3)
