= EIF3I =

Protein-coding gene in humans

Identifiers
- Aliases: EIF3I, EIF3S2, PRO2242, TRIP-1, TRIP1, eIF3-beta, eIF3-p36, eukaryotic translation initiation factor 3 subunit I
- External IDs: OMIM: 603911; MGI: 1860763; GeneCards: EIF3I

Gene location (Human)
Chr.	Chromosome 1 (human)
Band	1p35.2	Start	32,221,077 bp
Band	1p35.2	End	32,245,397 bp

Gene location (Mouse)
Chr.	Chromosome 4 (mouse)
Band	4 D2.2|4 63.26 cM	Start	129,485,753 bp
Band	4 D2.2|4 63.26 cM	End	129,494,441 bp
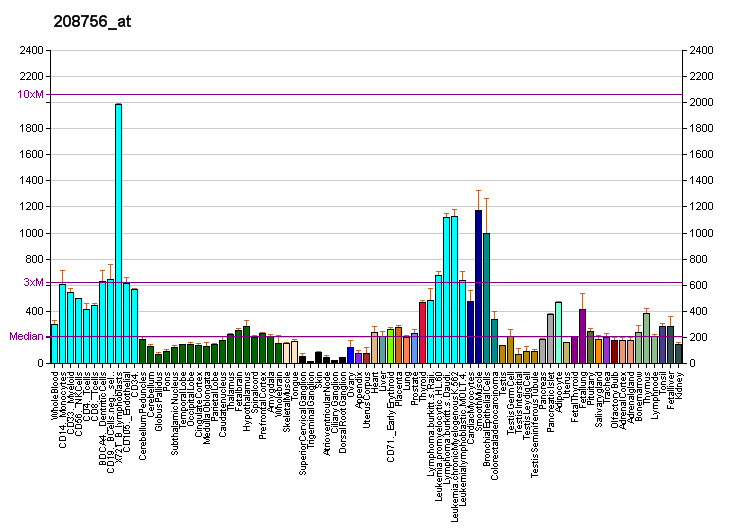
RNA expression pattern
Bgee	Human / Mouse (ortholog); Top expressed in: islet of Langerhans; ganglionic eminence; smooth muscle tissue; gastrocnemius muscle; rectum; left adrenal gland; right adrenal gland; ventricular zone; muscle of thigh; left adrenal cortex / Top expressed in: endocardial cushion; Paneth cell; Rostral migratory stream; internal carotid artery; condyle; atrioventricular valve; external carotid artery; vas deferens; fossa; human fetus; More reference expression data
BioGPS	More reference expression data
Gene ontology
Molecular function	protein binding; translation initiation factor activity
Cellular component	extracellular exosome; cytosol; cytoplasm; eukaryotic translation initiation factor 3 complex; eukaryotic translation initiation factor 3 complex, eIF3m; eukaryotic 43S preinitiation complex; eukaryotic 48S preinitiation complex
Biological process	translational initiation; protein biosynthesis; formation of cytoplasmic translation initiation complex; cytoplasmic translational initiation
Sources:Amigo / QuickGO
Orthologs
Databases	NCBI: entry; OMA: entry
Species	Human	Mouse
Entrez	8668	54709
Ensembl	ENSG00000084623	ENSMUSG00000028798
UniProt	Q13347	Q9QZD9
RefSeq (mRNA)	NM_003757; NM_001394168	NM_018799
RefSeq (protein)	NP_003748	NP_061269
Location (UCSC)	Chr 1: 32.22 – 32.25 Mb	Chr 4: 129.49 – 129.49 Mb
PubMed search
- Wikidata
View/Edit Human	View/Edit Mouse

Eukaryotic translation initiation factor 3 subunit I (eIF3i) is a protein that in humans is encoded by the EIF3I gene.

== Interactions ==
eIF3i has been shown to interact with TGF beta 1 and eIF3a.

== See also ==
- Eukaryotic initiation factor 3 (eIF3)
