= FBXO32 =

Protein-coding gene in the species Homo sapiens

Identifiers
- Aliases: FBXO32, Fbx32, MAFbx, F-box protein 32
- External IDs: OMIM: 606604; MGI: 1914981; GeneCards: FBXO32

Gene location (Human)
| Chr. | Chromosome 8 (human) |
| Band | 8q24.13 | Start | 123,497,889 bp |
| Band | 8q24.13 | End | 123,541,206 bp |

Gene location (Mouse)
| Chr. | Chromosome 15 (mouse) |
| Band | 15|15 D1 | Start | 58,039,275 bp |
| Band | 15|15 D1 | End | 58,078,328 bp |
RNA expression pattern
| Bgee | Human / Mouse (ortholog); Top expressed in: cardiac muscle tissue of right atrium; deltoid muscle; tibialis anterior muscle; myocardium of left ventricle; gastrocnemius muscle; quadriceps femoris muscle; vastus lateralis muscle; gastric mucosa; biceps brachii; Skeletal muscle tissue of biceps brachii / Top expressed in: muscle of thigh; skeletal muscle tissue; quadriceps femoris muscle; esophagus; urinary bladder; uterus; zone of skin; heart; lip; cochlea; More reference expression data |
| BioGPS | n/a |
Gene ontology
| Molecular function | protein binding; ubiquitin-protein transferase activity |
| Cellular component | cytoplasm; Z discdkac; nucleoplasm; cytosol; nucleus; SCF ubiquitin ligase complex |
| Biological process | response to denervation involved in regulation of muscle adaptation; cellular response to dexamethasone stimulus; protein polyubiquitination; protein ubiquitination; post-translational protein modification |
Sources:Amigo / QuickGO
Orthologs
| Databases | NCBI: entry; OMA: entry |
| Species | Human | Mouse |
| Entrez | 114907 | 67731 |
| Ensembl | ENSG00000156804 | ENSMUSG00000022358 |
| UniProt | Q969P5 | Q9CPU7 |
| RefSeq (mRNA) | NM_148177; NM_001242463; NM_058229 | NM_026346 |
| RefSeq (protein) | NP_001229392; NP_478136; NP_680482 | NP_080622 |
| Location (UCSC) | Chr 8: 123.5 – 123.54 Mb | Chr 15: 58.04 – 58.08 Mb |
| PubMed search |
- Wikidata
| View/Edit Human | View/Edit Mouse |

F-box only protein 32, also known as "MAFbx", for "Muscle Atrophy F-box gene", and "Atrogin-1," is a protein that in humans is encoded by the FBXO32 gene.

== Function ==
This gene encodes a member of the F-box protein family which is characterized by an approximately 40 amino acid motif, the F-box. The F-box proteins constitute one of the four subunits of the ubiquitin protein ligase complex called SCFs (SKP1-cullin-F-box), which function in phosphorylation-dependent ubiquitination. The F-box proteins are divided into 3 classes: Fbws containing WD-40 domains, Fbls containing leucine-rich repeats, and Fbxs containing either different protein-protein interaction modules or no recognizable motifs. The protein encoded by this gene belongs to the Fbxs class and contains an F-box domain. This protein is highly expressed during muscle atrophy, whereas mice deficient in this gene were found to be resistant to atrophy. This protein is thus a potential drug target for the treatment of muscle atrophy. Alternative splicing of this gene results in two transcript variants encoding two isoforms of different sizes.

== Interactions ==
FBXO32 has been shown to interact with EIF3A.

== Cancer ==
FBXO32 gene has been observed progressively downregulated in Human papillomavirus-positive neoplastic keratinocytes derived from uterine cervical preneoplastic lesions at different levels of malignancy. For this reason, FBXO32 is likely to be associated with tumorigenesis and may be a potential prognostic marker for uterine cervical preneoplastic lesions progression.
