= EIF3CL =

Protein-coding gene in the species Homo sapiens

Identifiers
- Aliases: EIF3CL, eukaryotic translation initiation factor 3 subunit C like
- External IDs: MGI: 1926966; GeneCards: EIF3CL
Available structures
| PDB | Ortholog search: PDBe RCSB |
| PDB | List of PDB id codes 3J8B, 3J8C |

Gene location (Human)
| Chr. | Chromosome 16 (human) |
| Band | 16p12.1 | Start | 28,379,579 bp |
| Band | 16p12.1 | End | 28,403,841 bp |

Gene location (Mouse)
| Chr. | Chromosome 7 (mouse) |
| Band | 7 69.14 cM|7 F3 | Start | 126,145,627 bp |
| Band | 7 69.14 cM|7 F3 | End | 126,165,583 bp |
RNA expression pattern
| Bgee | Human / Mouse (ortholog); Top expressed in: apex of heart; left ventricle; mucosa of transverse colon; epithelium of colon; right auricle of heart; skeletal muscle tissue; gastrocnemius muscle; anterior cingulate cortex; hippocampus proper; gonad / Top expressed in: tail of embryo; genital tubercle; mandibular prominence; maxillary prominence; somite; endothelial cell of lymphatic vessel; Gonadal ridge; hair follicle; primitive streak; dermis; More reference expression data |
| BioGPS | n/a |
Gene ontology
| Molecular function | translation initiation factor binding; translation initiation factor activity; RNA binding |
| Cellular component | cytoplasm; eukaryotic translation initiation factor 3 complex; eukaryotic 43S preinitiation complex; eukaryotic 48S preinitiation complex |
| Biological process | translational initiation; protein biosynthesis; formation of cytoplasmic translation initiation complex; cytoplasmic translational initiation |
Sources:Amigo / QuickGO
Orthologs
| Databases | NCBI: entry; OMA: entry |
| Species | Human | Mouse |
| Entrez | 728689 | 56347 |
| Ensembl | ENSG00000205609 | ENSMUSG00000030738 |
| UniProt | B5ME19 | Q8R1B4 |
| RefSeq (mRNA) | NM_001099661; NM_001317856; NM_001317857 | NM_146200 |
| RefSeq (protein) | NP_001093131; NP_001304785; NP_001304786 | NP_666312 |
| Location (UCSC) | Chr 16: 28.38 – 28.4 Mb | Chr 7: 126.15 – 126.17 Mb |
| PubMed search |
- Wikidata
| View/Edit Human | View/Edit Mouse |

Eukaryotic translation initiation factor 3 subunit C like is a protein that in humans is encoded by the EIF3CL gene.

== Function ==
The protein encoded by this gene is a core subunit of the eukaryotic translation initiation factor 3 (eIF3) complex. The encoded protein is nearly identical to another protein, eIF3c, from a related gene. The eIF3 complex binds the 40S ribosome and mRNAs to enable translation initiation. Several transcript variants encoding the same protein have been found for this gene. [provided by RefSeq, Dec 2015].

== See also ==
- Eukaryotic initiation factor 3 (eIF3)
