= EIF3L =

Protein-coding gene in the species Homo sapiens

Identifiers
- Aliases: EIF3L, EIF3EIP, EIF3S11, EIF3S6IP, HSPC021, HSPC025, MSTP005, eukaryotic translation initiation factor 3 subunit L
- External IDs: MGI: 2386251; GeneCards: EIF3L
Available structures
PDB	Ortholog search: PDBe RCSB
PDB	List of PDB id codes 3J8B, 3J8C

Gene location (Human)
Chr.	Chromosome 22 (human)
Band	22q13.1	Start	37,848,868 bp
Band	22q13.1	End	37,889,407 bp

Gene location (Mouse)
Chr.	Chromosome 15 (mouse)
Band	15 E1|15 37.7 cM	Start	78,959,379 bp
Band	15 E1|15 37.7 cM	End	78,978,605 bp
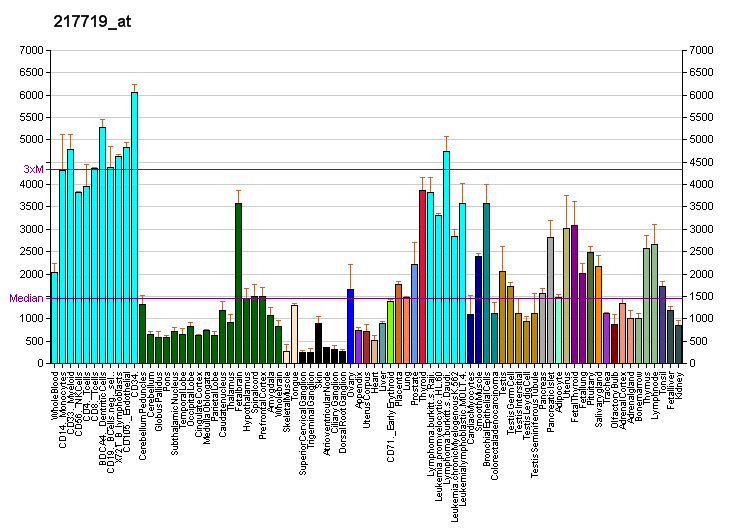
RNA expression pattern
Bgee	Human / Mouse (ortholog); Top expressed in: gonad; ganglionic eminence; ventricular zone; left ovary; right ovary; epithelium of colon; stromal cell of endometrium; body of pancreas; canal of the cervix; granulocyte / Top expressed in: otic vesicle; maxillary prominence; mandibular prominence; primitive streak; otic placode; abdominal wall; somite; dermis; endocardial cushion; vas deferens; More reference expression data
BioGPS	More reference expression data
Gene ontology
Molecular function	protein binding; translation initiation factor activity; RNA binding
Cellular component	nucleolus; membrane; fibrillar center; cytosol; nucleoplasm; cytoplasm; eukaryotic translation initiation factor 3 complex; eukaryotic 43S preinitiation complex; eukaryotic 48S preinitiation complex
Biological process	translational initiation; viral translational termination-reinitiation; protein biosynthesis; formation of cytoplasmic translation initiation complex; cytoplasmic translational initiation
Sources:Amigo / QuickGO
Orthologs
Databases	NCBI: entry; OMA: entry
Species	Human	Mouse
Entrez	51386	223691
Ensembl	ENSG00000100129	ENSMUSG00000033047
UniProt	Q9Y262	Q8QZY1
RefSeq (mRNA)	NM_001242923; NM_016091; NM_001363785	NM_145139
RefSeq (protein)	NP_001229852; NP_057175; NP_001350714	NP_660121
Location (UCSC)	Chr 22: 37.85 – 37.89 Mb	Chr 15: 78.96 – 78.98 Mb
PubMed search
- Wikidata
View/Edit Human	View/Edit Mouse

Eukaryotic translation initiation factor 3 subunit L (eIF3l) is a protein that in humans is encoded by the EIF3L gene (previously EIF3EIP).

== Interactions ==
eIF3l has been shown to interact with eIF3a.

== See also ==
- Eukaryotic initiation factor 3 (eIF3)
