= EIF3B =

Protein-coding gene in the species Homo sapiens

Identifiers
- Aliases: EIF3B, EIF3-ETA, EIF3-P110, EIF3-P116, EIF3S9, PRT1, eukaryotic translation initiation factor 3 subunit B
- External IDs: OMIM: 603917; MGI: 106478; GeneCards: EIF3B
Available structures
PDB	Ortholog search: PDBe RCSB
PDB	List of PDB id codes 2KRB, 2NLW, 5K1H

Gene location (Human)
Chr.	Chromosome 7 (human)
Band	7p22.3	Start	2,354,086 bp
Band	7p22.3	End	2,380,745 bp

Gene location (Mouse)
Chr.	Chromosome 5 (mouse)
Band	5 G2|5 78.97 cM	Start	140,405,083 bp
Band	5 G2|5 78.97 cM	End	140,429,115 bp
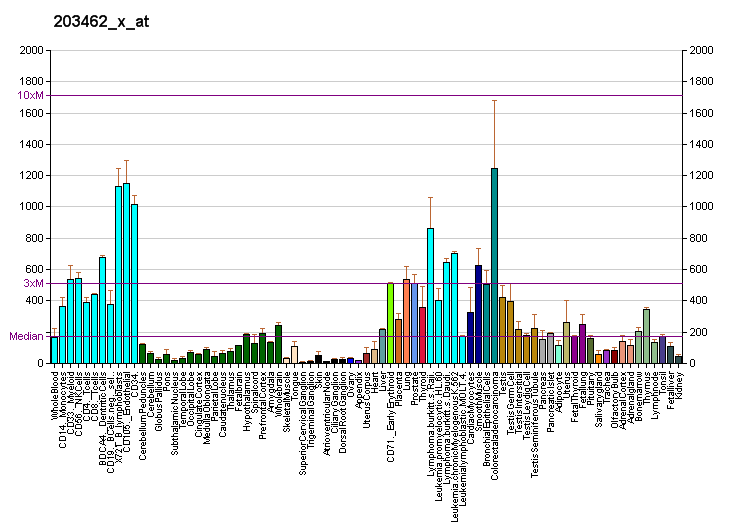

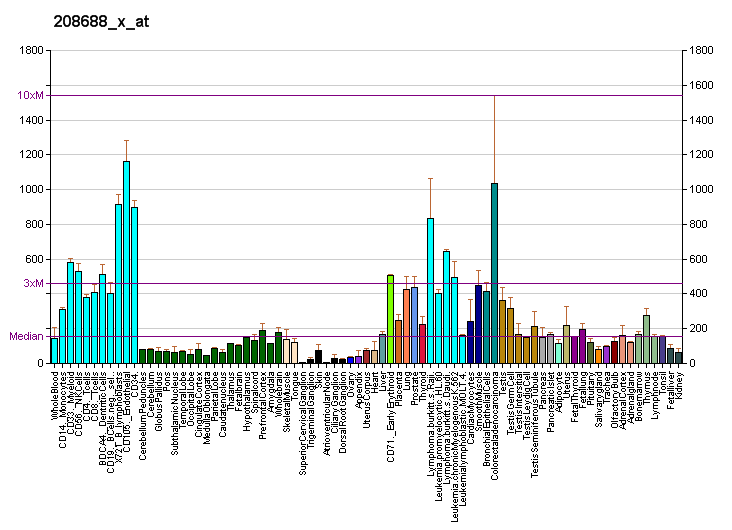

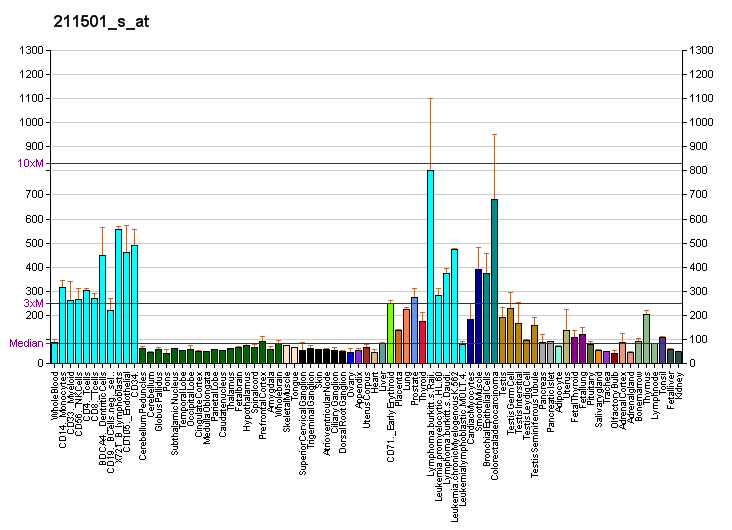
RNA expression pattern
Bgee	Human / Mouse (ortholog); Top expressed in: body of pancreas; skin of abdomen; skin of leg; muscle layer of sigmoid colon; stromal cell of endometrium; left uterine tube; gastrocnemius muscle; ventricular zone; right ovary; smooth muscle tissue / Top expressed in: epiblast; spermatid; ventricular zone; yolk sac; lip; otic vesicle; lactiferous gland; somite; morula; morula; More reference expression data
BioGPS	More reference expression data
Gene ontology
Molecular function	molecular adaptor activity; translation initiation factor binding; protein binding; translation initiation factor activity; nucleic acid binding; RNA binding
Cellular component	cytosol; eukaryotic translation initiation factor 3 complex; eukaryotic translation initiation factor 3 complex, eIF3m; extracellular exosome; cytoplasm; eukaryotic 43S preinitiation complex; eukaryotic 48S preinitiation complex; synapse
Biological process	translational initiation; IRES-dependent viral translational initiation; protein biosynthesis; viral translational termination-reinitiation; regulation of translational initiation; formation of cytoplasmic translation initiation complex; cytoplasmic translational initiation
Sources:Amigo / QuickGO
Orthologs
Databases	NCBI: entry; OMA: entry
Species	Human	Mouse
Entrez	8662	27979
Ensembl	ENSG00000106263	ENSMUSG00000056076
UniProt	P55884	Q8JZQ9
RefSeq (mRNA)	NM_001037283; NM_003751; NM_001362791; NM_001362792; NM_001362793 NM_182712	NM_133916
RefSeq (protein)	NP_001032360; NP_003742; NP_001349720; NP_001349721; NP_001349722	NP_598677
Location (UCSC)	Chr 7: 2.35 – 2.38 Mb	Chr 5: 140.41 – 140.43 Mb
PubMed search
- Wikidata
View/Edit Human	View/Edit Mouse

Eukaryotic translation initiation factor 3 subunit B (eIF3b) is a protein that in humans is encoded by the EIF3B gene.

== Interactions ==
EIF3B has been shown to interact with P70-S6 Kinase 1 and EIF3A.

== See also ==
- Eukaryotic initiation factor 3 (eIF3)
