= EIF3F =

Protein-coding gene in the species Homo sapiens

Identifiers
- Aliases: EIF3F, EIF3S5, eIF3-p47, eukaryotic translation initiation factor 3 subunit F, MRT67
- External IDs: OMIM: 603914; MGI: 1913335; GeneCards: EIF3F
Available structures
PDB	Ortholog search: PDBe RCSB
PDB	List of PDB id codes 3J8B, 3J8C
Enzyme activity
EC #	BRENDA	ExPASy	KEGG	MetaCyc
3.4.19.12	↗	↗	↗	↗

Gene location (Human)
Chr.	Chromosome 11 (human)
Band	11p15.4	Start	7,970,251 bp
Band	11p15.4	End	8,001,862 bp

Gene location (Mouse)
Chr.	Chromosome 7 (mouse)
Band	7|7 E3	Start	108,533,624 bp
Band	7|7 E3	End	108,542,158 bp
RNA expression pattern
Bgee	Human / Mouse (ortholog); Top expressed in: gonad; ganglionic eminence; left ovary; skin of leg; skin of abdomen; body of pancreas; ventricular zone; right ovary; stromal cell of endometrium; body of uterus / Top expressed in: Paneth cell; transitional epithelium of urinary bladder; vas deferens; vestibular sensory epithelium; medial ganglionic eminence; hair follicle; utricle; endothelial cell of lymphatic vessel; internal carotid artery; fossa; More reference expression data
BioGPS	n/a
Gene ontology
Molecular function	cysteine-type peptidase activity; translation initiation factor activity; thiol-dependent deubiquitinase; peptidase activity; protein binding; hydrolase activity; translation initiation factor binding
Cellular component	cytoplasm; cytosol; eukaryotic translation initiation factor 3 complex; membrane; eukaryotic translation initiation factor 3 complex, eIF3m; eukaryotic 43S preinitiation complex; eukaryotic 48S preinitiation complex
Biological process	proteolysis; translational initiation; protein biosynthesis; IRES-dependent viral translational initiation; protein deubiquitination; formation of cytoplasmic translation initiation complex; cytoplasmic translational initiation
Sources:Amigo / QuickGO
Orthologs
Databases	NCBI: entry; OMA: entry
Species	Human	Mouse
Entrez	8665	66085
Ensembl	ENSG00000175390	ENSMUSG00000031029
UniProt	O00303	Q9DCH4
RefSeq (mRNA)	NM_003754	NM_025344
RefSeq (protein)	NP_003745	NP_079620
Location (UCSC)	Chr 11: 7.97 – 8 Mb	Chr 7: 108.53 – 108.54 Mb
PubMed search
- Wikidata
View/Edit Human	View/Edit Mouse

Eukaryotic translation initiation factor 3 subunit F (eIF3f) is a protein that in humans is encoded by the EIF3F gene.

== Interactions ==
EIF3F has been shown to interact with Mammalian target of rapamycin and EIF3A.

== See also ==
- Eukaryotic initiation factor 3 (eIF3)
