= Eukaryotic initiation factor 3 =

Multiprotein complex that functions during the initiation phase of eukaryotic translation

Eukaryotic translation initiation factor 3
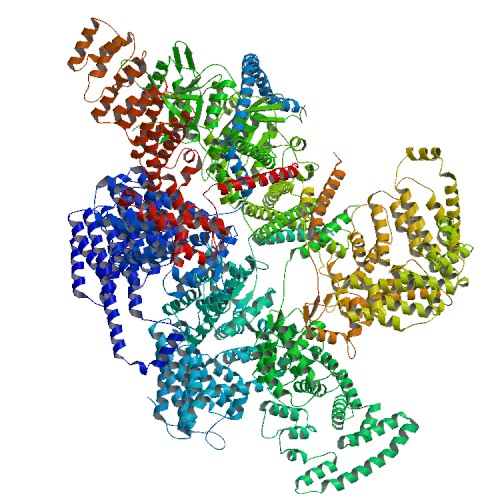
- Structure of rabbit eIF3 in the context of the 43S PIC, showing subunits a, c, e, f, h, k, l, and m.

Overview
- Synonyms: eIF3
- Subunits: Module A (EIF3A, EIF3B, EIF3G, EIF3I), Module B (EIF3F, EIF3H, EIF3M), Module C (EIF3C, EIF3D, EIF3E, EIF3K, EIF3L), EIF3J
- Molecular mass: ~800 kDa
- Functions: 43S preinitiation complex assembly

Biological context
- Location: cytoplasm
- Pathways: RNA translation
- Complex Portal: CPX-6036

Eukaryotic initiation factor 3 (eIF3) is a multiprotein complex that functions during the initiation phase of eukaryotic translation. It is essential for most forms of cap-dependent and cap-independent translation initiation. In humans, eIF3 consists of 13 nonidentical subunits (eIF3a-m) with a combined molecular weight of ~800 kDa, making it the largest translation initiation factor. The eIF3 complex is broadly conserved across eukaryotes, but the conservation of individual subunits varies across organisms. For instance, while most mammalian eIF3 complexes are composed of 13 subunits, budding yeast's eIF3 has only six subunits (eIF3a, b, c, g, i, j).

== Function ==
eIF3 stimulates nearly all steps of translation initiation. eIF3 also appears to participate in other phases of translation, such as recycling, where it promotes the splitting of post-termination ribosomes. In specialized cases of reinitiation following uORFs, eIF3 may remain bound to the ribosome through elongation and termination to promote subsequent initiation events. Research has also indicated that eIF3 plays a role in programmed stop codon readthrough in yeast, by interacting with pre-termination complexes and interfering with decoding.

== Interactions ==
eIF3 binds the small ribosomal subunit (40S) at and near its solvent side and serves as a scaffold for several other initiation factors, the auxiliary factor DHX29, and mRNA. eIF3 is a component of the multifactor complex (MFC) and 43S and 48S preinitiation complexes (PICs). The interactions of eIF3 with other initiation factors can vary amongst species; for example, mammalian eIF3 directly interacts with the eIF4F complex (via eIF4G), while budding yeast lacks this connection. However, both mammalian and yeast eIF3 independently bind eIF1, eIF4B, and eIF5.

Several subunits of eIF3 contain RNA recognition motifs (RRMs) and other RNA binding domains to form a multisubunit RNA binding interface through which eIF3 interacts with cellular and viral IRES mRNA, including the HCV IRES. eIF3 has also been shown to specifically bind m^{6}A modified RNA within 5'UTRs to promote cap-independent translation.

All five core subunits of budding yeast's eIF3 are present in heat-induced stress granules, along with several other translation factors.

== Structure ==
A functional eIF3 complex can be purified from native sources, or reconstituted from recombinantly expressed subunits. Individual subunits have been structurally characterized by X-ray crystallography and NMR, while complexes have been characterized by Cryo-EM. No structure of complete human eIF3 is available, but the nearly-full complex has been determined at medium resolution in the context of the 43S PIC. The structural core of mammalian eIF3 is often described as a five-lobed particle with anthropomorphic features, composed largely of the PCI/MPN octamer. The PCI domains are named for structural similarities between the proteasome cap (P), the COP9 signalosome (C), and eIF3 (I), while the MPN domains are named for structural similarity to the Mpr1-PadI N-terminal domains.

== Signaling ==
eIF3 serves as a hub for cellular signaling through S6K1 and mTOR/Raptor. In particular, eIF3 is bound by S6K1 in its inactive state, and activated mTOR/Raptor binds to eIF3 and phosphorylates S6K1 to promote its release from eIF3. Phosphorylated S6K1 is then free to phosphorylate a number of its own targets, including eIF4B, thus serving as a mechanism of translational control.

== Disease ==
Individual subunits of eIF3 are overexpressed (a, b, c, h, i, and m) and underexpressed (e, f) in multiple human cancers. In breast cancer and malignant prostate cancer, eIF3h is overexpressed. eIF3 has also been shown to bind a specific set of cell proliferation mRNAs and regulate their translation. eIF3 also functions in the life cycles of a number of important human pathogens, including HIV and HCV. In particular, the d-subunit of eIF3 is a substrate of HIV protease, and genetic knockdown of eIF3 subunits d, e, or f results in increased viral infectivity for unknown reasons.

== Subunits ==
The eIF3 subunits exist at equal stoichiometry within the complex, with the exception of eIF3J, which is loosely bound and non-essential for viability in several species. The subunits were originally organized alphabetically by molecular weight in mammals (A as the highest), but the arrangement of molecular weight can vary between species.

Subunit	MW (kDa)^{[A]}	Key Features
A	167	Upregulated in several human cancers. Crosslinks directly to cellular mRNA. Contains PCI domain.
B	92	Upregulated in several cancers. Crosslinks directly to cellular mRNA. Contains RRM.
C	105	Upregulated in several cancers. Contains PCI domain. Has a human paralog eIF3CL.
D	64	Dispensable for growth in fission yeast. Crosslinks directly to cellular mRNA and binds the 5'cap of select mRNAs. Substrate of HIV protease.
E	52	Downregulated in breast and lung cancers. Nonessential for growth in fission yeast and Neurospora crassa. Contains PCI domain.
F	38	Downregulated in several cancers. Contains MPN domain.
G	36	Contains RRM. Crosslinks directly to cellular mRNA.
H	40	Upregulated in several cancers. Nonessential for growth in fission yeast, Neurospora crassa, and human cell lines. Contains MPN domain.
I	36	Upregulated in several cancers.
J	29	Loosely bound, non-stoichiometric subunit. Binds the 40S ribosomal subunit within the decoding center. Nonessential for growth in budding yeast.
K	25	Nonessential for growth in Neurospora crassa. Contains PCI domain.
L	67	Nonessential for growth in Neurospora crassa. Contains PCI domain.
M	43	Upregulated in human colon cancer.

^{A} Molecular weight of human subunits from Uniprot.

== See also ==
- Eukaryotic translation
- 40S ribosomal subunit
- 43S preinitiation complex
- DHX29
