= EIF4B =

Protein-coding gene in humans

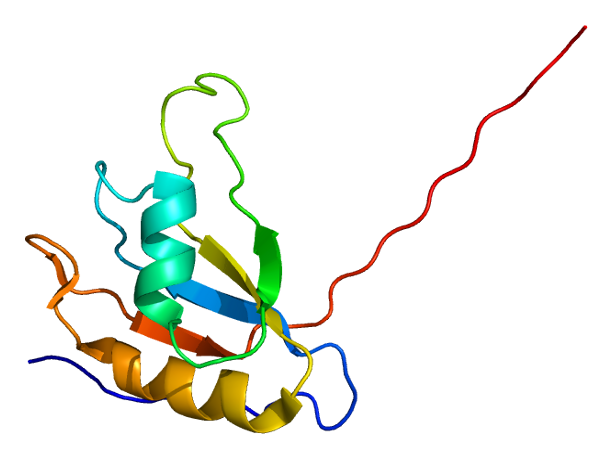

Identifiers
- Aliases: EIF4B, EIF-4B, PRO1843, eukaryotic translation initiation factor 4B
- External IDs: OMIM: 603928; MGI: 95304; GeneCards: EIF4B
Available structures
PDB	Ortholog search: PDBe RCSB
PDB	List of PDB id codes 1WI8, 2J76

Gene location (Human)
Chr.	Chromosome 12 (human)
Band	12q13.13	Start	53,006,282 bp
Band	12q13.13	End	53,042,215 bp

Gene location (Mouse)
Chr.	Chromosome 15 (mouse)
Band	15|15 F2	Start	101,982,208 bp
Band	15|15 F2	End	102,005,608 bp
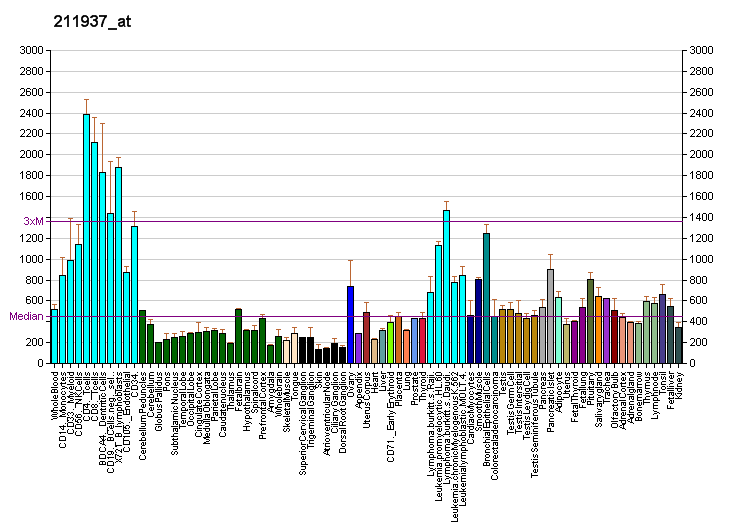

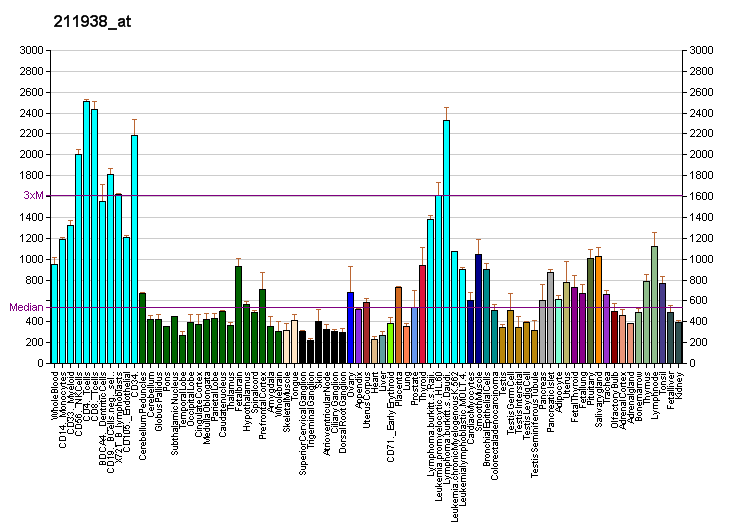
RNA expression pattern
Bgee	Human / Mouse (ortholog); Top expressed in: Achilles tendon; ganglionic eminence; left ovary; epithelium of colon; islet of Langerhans; stromal cell of endometrium; body of pancreas; right ovary; ventricular zone; monocyte / Top expressed in: tail of embryo; lacrimal gland; genital tubercle; epiblast; ankle; ventricular zone; somite; mandibular prominence; left lung lobe; vas deferens; More reference expression data
BioGPS	More reference expression data
Gene ontology
Molecular function	protein binding; nucleic acid binding; ribosomal small subunit binding; helicase activity; RNA strand-exchange activity; RNA strand annealing activity; RNA binding; translation initiation factor activity
Cellular component	cytosol; eukaryotic translation initiation factor 4F complex; polysome
Biological process	nuclear-transcribed mRNA poly(A) tail shortening; regulation of translational initiation; formation of translation preinitiation complex; eukaryotic translation initiation factor 4F complex assembly; protein biosynthesis; translational initiation; cytoplasmic translation
Sources:Amigo / QuickGO
Orthologs
Databases	NCBI: entry; OMA: entry
Species	Human	Mouse
Entrez	1975	75705
Ensembl	ENSG00000063046	ENSMUSG00000058655
UniProt	P23588	Q8BGD9
RefSeq (mRNA)	NM_001300821; NM_001417; NM_018507; NM_001330654	NM_145625
RefSeq (protein)	NP_001287750; NP_001317583; NP_001408	NP_663600
Location (UCSC)	Chr 12: 53.01 – 53.04 Mb	Chr 15: 101.98 – 102.01 Mb
PubMed search
- Wikidata
View/Edit Human	View/Edit Mouse

Eukaryotic translation initiation factor 4B is a protein that in humans is encoded by the EIF4B gene.

== Structure ==
EIF4B is characterized by a single folded RNA recognition motif (RRM) near its N-terminus, which adopts a classical beta alpha beta beta alpha beta topology. This RRM is responsible for RNA binding but interacts with RNA relatively weakly on its own; high-affinity binding is facilitated by adjacent N- and C-terminal extensions. The majority of the EIF4B protein, encompassing roughly 400 amino acids downstream of the RRM, is intrinsically disordered and forms what is known as the intrinsically disordered region (IDR). This IDR does not adopt a stable three-dimensional structure but instead enables dynamic interactions, self-association, and the formation of large oligomers and biomolecular condensates under certain cellular conditions. A short helical segment within the IDR, coinciding with an arginine-rich motif (ARM), further contributes to RNA binding.

Mammalian eIF4B acts as a dimer, and other studies had shown that it could form higher-order oligomers as well, through intrinsically disordered regions (IDR).

== Function ==
Eukaryotic translation initiation factor 4B (EIF4B) is a multidomain protein essential for efficient cap-dependent translation in eukaryotic cells. Structurally, EIF4B contains a single folded RNA recognition motif (RRM) near its N-terminus. This RRM is responsible for RNA binding but interacts with RNA relatively weakly on its own; high-affinity binding is facilitated by adjacent N- and C-terminal extensions. The majority of the EIF4B protein, encompassing roughly 400 amino acids downstream of the RRM, is intrinsically disordered and forms what is known as the intrinsically disordered region (IDR). This IDR does not adopt a stable three-dimensional structure but instead enables dynamic interactions, self-association, and the formation of large oligomers and biomolecular condensates under certain cellular conditions. A short helical segment within the IDR, coinciding with an arginine-rich motif (ARM), further contributes to RNA binding. The flexible and highly dynamic nature of the IDR allows EIF4B to orchestrate diverse molecular interactions critical for translation initiation, including stimulation of the helicase activity of eIF4A and supporting the assembly of other components of the translation initiation machinery.

EIF4B is a critical protein in the process of cap-dependent translation initiation in eukaryotic cells. Its primary function is to enhance the helicase activity of eIF4A, a DEAD-box RNA helicase, by stimulating its ability to unwind secondary structures in the 5′ untranslated regions (UTRs) of mRNAs[9]. This unwinding activity is vital for the ribosome to scan along the mRNA and locate the start codon efficiently. eIF4B also acts as a scaffold by interacting with other translation initiation factors, such as eIF3 and eIF4F, facilitating the assembly of the translation initiation complex. Furthermore, eIF4B’s RNA binding capacity—mediated both by its RNA recognition motif (RRM) and its arginine-rich motif (ARM)—directly supports the recruitment and stabilization of mRNA on the ribosome, ensuring efficient and accurate initiation of protein synthesis. The multifaceted functions of eIF4B are essential for regulating translational output and adapting protein synthesis to cellular conditions.

eIF4B has been shown to interact with and stimulate the enzymatic/RNA helicase activity of eIF4A, also increasing its RNA and ATP binding activity, and bind to the eIF3 complex through the eIF3A subunit. This interaction results in the recruitment of the eukaryotic small ribosomal subunit (40S) to the mRNA which will in turn set the stage for the later steps leading to elongation.

== Clinical significance ==
eIF4B is overexpressed in cancer cells and certain studies had named eIF4B as a potential therapeutic target for treatment of certain types of cancer.

== See also ==
- Eukaryotic translation
- eIF4F
