= EIF4H =

Protein-coding gene in the species Homo sapiens

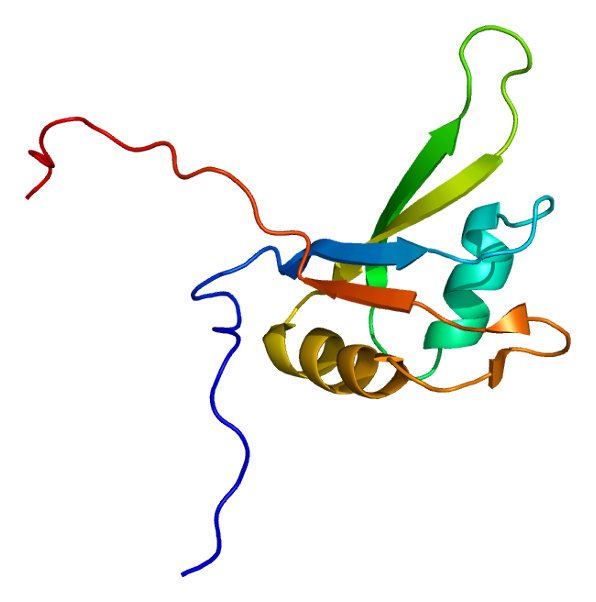

Identifiers
- Aliases: EIF4H, WBSCR1, WSCR1, eIF-4H, eukaryotic translation initiation factor 4H
- External IDs: OMIM: 603431; MGI: 1341822; GeneCards: EIF4H
Available structures
PDB	Ortholog search: PDBe RCSB
PDB	List of PDB id codes 2DNG

Gene location (Human)
Chr.	Chromosome 7 (human)
Band	7q11.23	Start	74,174,231 bp
Band	7q11.23	End	74,197,122 bp

Gene location (Mouse)
Chr.	Chromosome 5 (mouse)
Band	5 G2|5 74.71 cM	Start	134,648,575 bp
Band	5 G2|5 74.71 cM	End	134,668,344 bp
RNA expression pattern
Bgee	Human / Mouse (ortholog); Top expressed in: parotid gland; skin of leg; C1 segment; body of pancreas; muscle layer of sigmoid colon; gastrocnemius muscle; gastric mucosa; prefrontal cortex; skin of abdomen; cerebellar hemisphere / Top expressed in: internal carotid artery; external carotid artery; primitive streak; medullary collecting duct; Paneth cell; left lung lobe; vestibular membrane of cochlear duct; Gonadal ridge; motor neuron; vestibular sensory epithelium; More reference expression data
BioGPS	n/a
Gene ontology
Molecular function	translation factor activity, RNA binding; protein binding; nucleic acid binding; ribosomal small subunit binding; RNA strand-exchange activity; helicase activity; RNA strand annealing activity; RNA binding; translation initiation factor activity; cadherin binding
Cellular component	cytoplasm; perinuclear region of cytoplasm; cytosol; eukaryotic translation initiation factor 4F complex; membrane; polysome
Biological process	translational initiation; viral process; developmental growth; sexual reproduction; regulation of translational initiation; protein biosynthesis; eukaryotic translation initiation factor 4F complex assembly; formation of translation preinitiation complex; cytoplasmic translation
Sources:Amigo / QuickGO
Orthologs
Databases	NCBI: entry; OMA: entry
Species	Human	Mouse
Entrez	7458	22384
Ensembl	ENSG00000106682	ENSMUSG00000040731
UniProt	Q15056	Q9WUK2
RefSeq (mRNA)	NM_022170; NM_031992	NM_033561; NM_001312867
RefSeq (protein)	NP_071496; NP_114381	NP_001299796; NP_291039
Location (UCSC)	Chr 7: 74.17 – 74.2 Mb	Chr 5: 134.65 – 134.67 Mb
PubMed search
- Wikidata
View/Edit Human	View/Edit Mouse

Eukaryotic translation initiation factor 4H is a protein that in humans is encoded by the EIF4H gene.

This gene encodes one of the translation initiation factors, which function to stimulate the initiation of protein synthesis at the level of mRNA utilization. This gene is deleted in Williams syndrome, a multisystem developmental disorder caused by the deletion of contiguous genes at 7q11.23. Alternative splicing of this gene generates 2 transcript variants.

EIF4H appears analogous to drr-2 in C. elegans which regulates the mTOR pathway and affects longevity.
