= EIF4G3 =

Protein-coding gene in humans

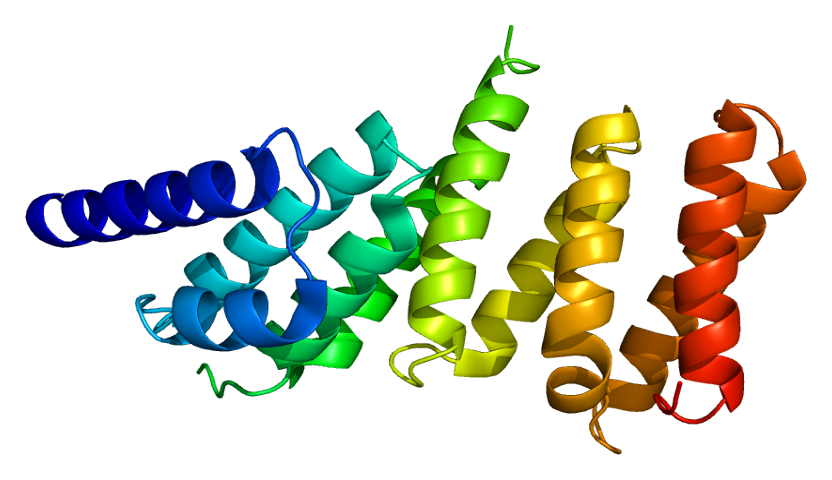

Identifiers
- Aliases: EIF4G3, eIF-4G 3, eIF4G 3, eIF4GII, eukaryotic translation initiation factor 4 gamma 3
- External IDs: OMIM: 603929; MGI: 1923935; GeneCards: EIF4G3
Available structures
PDB	Ortholog search: PDBe RCSB
PDB	List of PDB id codes 1HU3

Gene location (Human)
Chr.	Chromosome 1 (human)
Band	1p36.12	Start	20,806,292 bp
Band	1p36.12	End	21,177,285 bp

Gene location (Mouse)
Chr.	Chromosome 4 (mouse)
Band	4|4 D3	Start	137,993,022 bp
Band	4|4 D3	End	138,208,508 bp
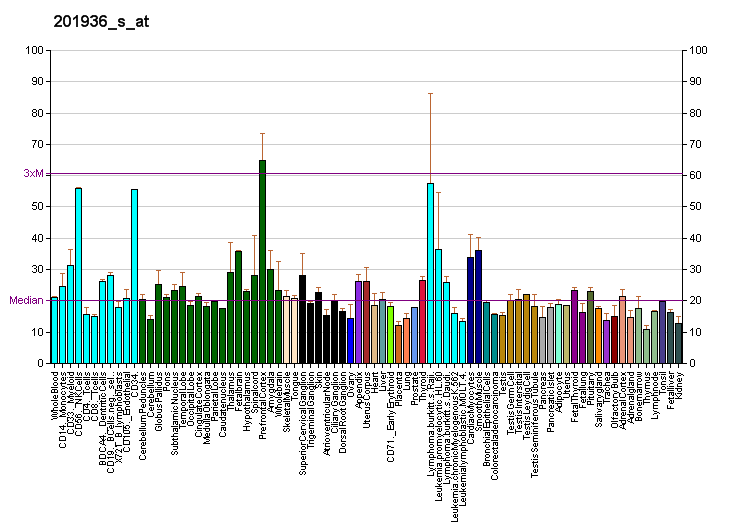

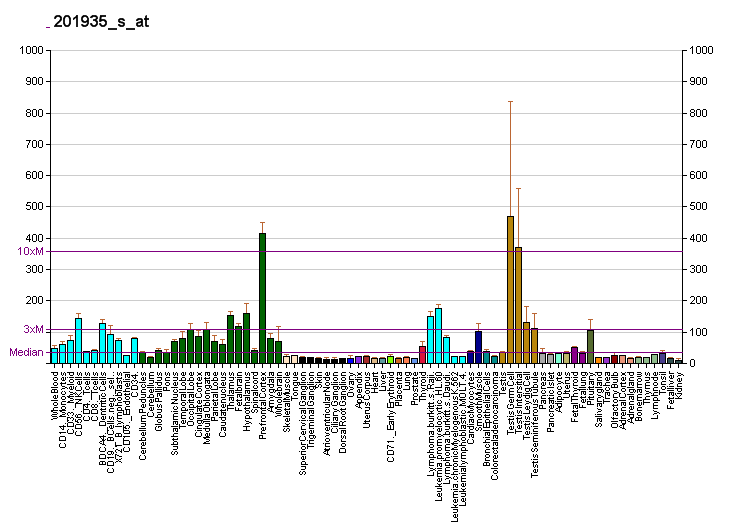
RNA expression pattern
Bgee	Human / Mouse (ortholog); Top expressed in: sperm; Epithelium of choroid plexus; right testis; left testis; frontal pole; Brodmann area 10; ventricular zone; epithelium of colon; lateral nuclear group of thalamus; middle frontal gyrus / Top expressed in: muscle of thigh; tail of embryo; genital tubercle; neural layer of retina; seminiferous tubule; knee joint; cerebellar cortex; primary visual cortex; superior frontal gyrus; triceps brachii muscle; More reference expression data
BioGPS	More reference expression data
Gene ontology
Molecular function	RNA cap binding; translation factor activity, RNA binding; translation initiation factor activity; RNA binding; protein binding; mRNA binding
Cellular component	cytosol; eukaryotic translation initiation factor 4F complex
Biological process	translational initiation; viral process; protein biosynthesis; regulation of translation; regulation of translational initiation; negative regulation of autophagy
Sources:Amigo / QuickGO
Orthologs
Databases	NCBI: entry; OMA: entry
Species	Human	Mouse
Entrez	8672	230861
Ensembl	ENSG00000075151	ENSMUSG00000028760
UniProt	O43432	Q80XI3
RefSeq (mRNA)	NM_001198801; NM_001198802; NM_001198803; NM_003760; NM_001391892 NM_001391893; NM_001391894; NM_001391895; NM_001391896; NM_001391897; NM_001391898; NM_001391899; NM_001391900; NM_001391901; NM_001391902; NM_001391903; NM_001391904; NM_001391905; NM_001391906; NM_001391907	NM_001256195; NM_001256198; NM_172703; NM_001355699; NM_001355700
RefSeq (protein)	NP_001185730; NP_001185731; NP_001185732; NP_003751	NP_001243124; NP_001243127; NP_766291; NP_001342628; NP_001342629 NP_001356059; NP_001356060
Location (UCSC)	Chr 1: 20.81 – 21.18 Mb	Chr 4: 137.99 – 138.21 Mb
PubMed search
- Wikidata
View/Edit Human	View/Edit Mouse

Eukaryotic translation initiation factor 4 gamma 3 is a protein that in humans is encoded by the EIF4G3 gene. The gene encodes a protein that functions in translation by aiding the assembly of the ribosome onto the messenger RNA template. Confusingly, this protein is usually referred to as eIF4GII, as although EIF4G3 is the third gene that is similar to eukaryotic translation initiation factor 4 gamma, the second isoform EIF4G2 is not an active translation initiation factor.

== Interactions ==
EIF4G3 has been shown to interact with PABPC1.
