= EIF3J =

Protein-coding gene in the species Homo sapiens

Identifiers
- Aliases: EIF3J, EIF3S1, eIF3-alpha, eIF3-p35, eukaryotic translation initiation factor 3 subunit J
- External IDs: OMIM: 603910; MGI: 3704486; GeneCards: EIF3J
Available structures
PDB	Ortholog search: PDBe RCSB
PDB	List of PDB id codes 2KRB, 3BPJ

Gene location (Human)
Chr.	Chromosome 15 (human)
Band	15q21.1	Start	44,537,125 bp
Band	15q21.1	End	44,563,029 bp

Gene location (Mouse)
Chr.	Chromosome 18 (mouse)
Band	18|18 B3	Start	43,608,483 bp
Band	18|18 B3	End	43,610,861 bp
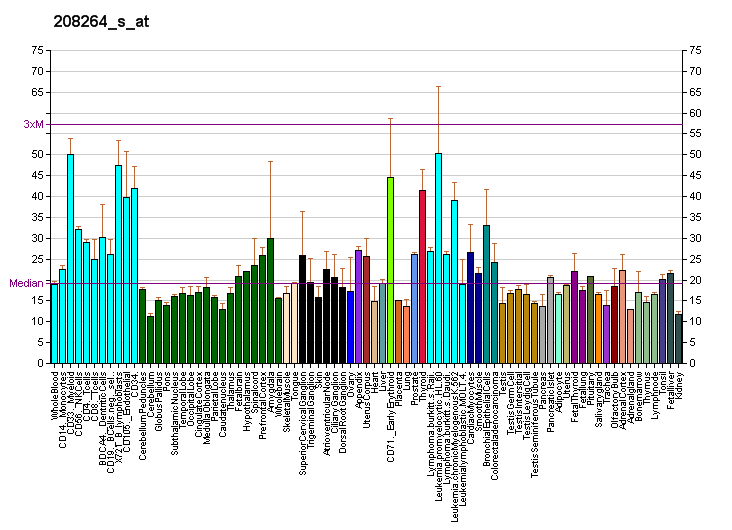

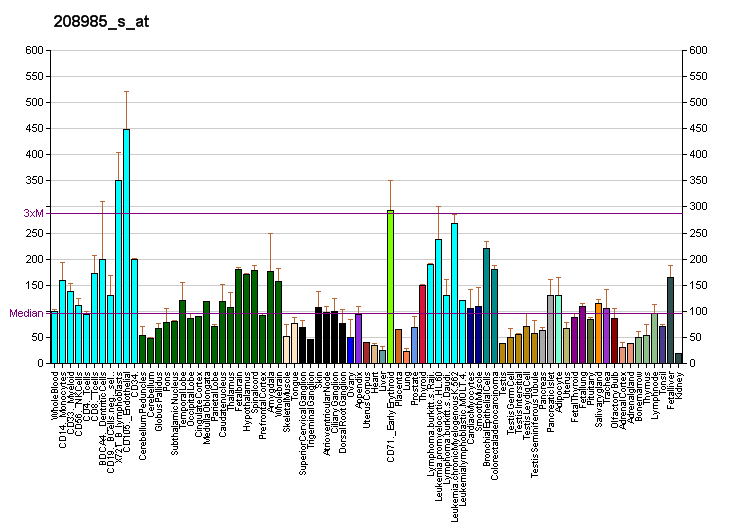

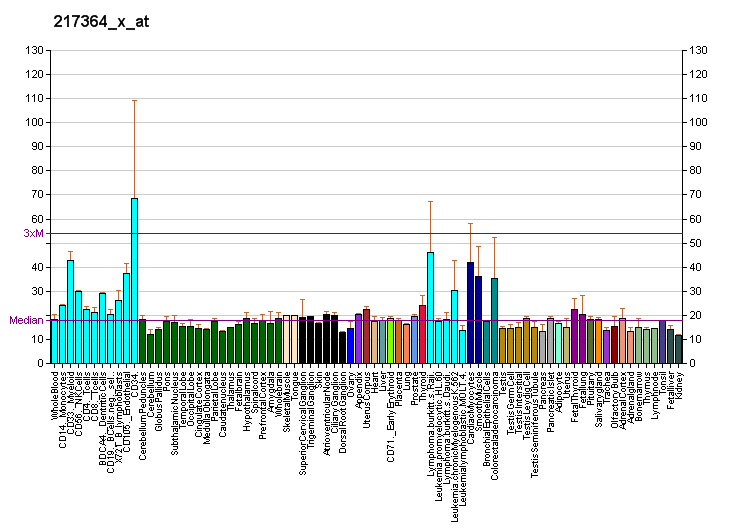
RNA expression pattern
Bgee	Human / Mouse (ortholog); Top expressed in: gastrocnemius muscle; biceps brachii; body of pancreas; muscle of thigh; sural nerve; epithelium of colon; Skeletal muscle tissue of rectus abdominis; Skeletal muscle tissue of biceps brachii; ganglionic eminence; gonad / Top expressed in: muscle of thigh; quadriceps femoris muscle; epiblast; tail of embryo; yolk sac; skeletal muscle tissue; placenta; embryo; embryo; zygote; More reference expression data
BioGPS	More reference expression data
Gene ontology
Molecular function	protein binding; translation initiation factor activity
Cellular component	cytoplasm; eukaryotic translation initiation factor 3 complex; cytosol; eukaryotic 43S preinitiation complex; eukaryotic 48S preinitiation complex
Biological process	translational initiation; protein biosynthesis; formation of cytoplasmic translation initiation complex; cytoplasmic translational initiation
Sources:Amigo / QuickGO
Orthologs
Databases	NCBI: entry; OMA: entry
Species	Human	Mouse
Entrez	8669	100042807
Ensembl	ENSG00000104131	ENSMUSG00000043424
UniProt	O75822	Q66JS6
RefSeq (mRNA)	NM_003758; NM_001284335; NM_001284336	NM_001256055
RefSeq (protein)	NP_001271264; NP_001271265; NP_003749	NP_001242984
Location (UCSC)	Chr 15: 44.54 – 44.56 Mb	Chr 18: 43.61 – 43.61 Mb
PubMed search
- Wikidata
View/Edit Human	View/Edit Mouse

Eukaryotic translation initiation factor 3 subunit J (eIF3j) is a protein that in humans is encoded by the EIF3J gene. It is implicated in translation initiation and recycling.

== Structure ==
The crystal structure of the C-terminal part of human eIF3j was determined in the scope of the Structural Genomics Consortium and showed that it consists of a 6-helix bundle. eIF3j has subsequently been visualized as part of ribosomal translation initiation complexes, both for human and yeast eIF3j. The general binding location is similar for both species, located at the A-site between eIF1A and helix 16 of the ribosomal small subunit. However, differences are apparent in the arrangement of the C-terminal helix bundle and its rotation. The N-terminal part of eIF3j was visualized only in the context of a yeast pre-initiation complex, showing that it binds the entry of the mRNA tunnel.

== Function ==
Eukaryotic translation initiation factor 3 subunit J is reported to play an important role in the assembly of the 43S pre-initiation complex. It specifically binds to the 40S subunit in vitro and increases the affinity of eIF3 to the small subunit. The binding of eIF3j to the small subunit occurs in an anticooperative fashion with eIF1, eIF1A, and the ternary complex of eIF2, tRNA, and GTP. However, eIF3 reduces the negative cooperativity strongly.

eIF3j's N-terminal part binds the mRNA channel and has been shown to reduce the mRNA's affinity to the ribosomal small subunit,thus preventing translation initiation to progress. The ternary complex is essential to reduce eIF3j's affinity for the 43S pre-initiation complex and therefore to allow binding of mRNA. However, despite the presence of eIF3j, mRNA may still be able to bind in a pre-accommodated state in presence of eIF4A, meaning that the mRNA partially occupies the mRNA channel but is not in its final position.

Start codon selection is reported to be effected by eIF3j, as knock-out of eIF3j leads to less stringent selection of start codons

The activity of eIF3j may be regulated by phosphorylation by CK2 and through cleavage by caspase-3.

== See also ==
- Eukaryotic initiation factor 3 (eIF3)
