= 43S preinitiation complex =

The 43S preinitiation complex (43S PIC) is a ribonucleoprotein complex that exists during an early step of eukaryotic translation initiation. The 43S PIC contains the small ribosomal subunit (40S) bound by the initiation factors eIF1, eIF1A, eIF3, and the eIF2-Met-tRNA_{i}^{Met}-GTP ternary complex (eIF2-TC).

== Function ==
The 43S is an important intermediate complex during cap-dependent initiation in translation. In the canonical model of translation initiation, the 43S PIC is pre-formed as a stable complex and recruited to the 5' cap of eukaryotic messenger RNAs (mRNAs) by the eIF4F complex. The 43S PIC then "scans" in the 5' --> 3' direction along the mRNA in an ATP-dependent fashion (via eIF4A and/or other RNA helicases such as Ded1/DDX3 and DHX29) to locate the start codon. Start codon recognition occurs through base-pairing between the Met-tRNA_{i}^{Met} and AUG in the ribosomal P-site and a number of associated changes, and is followed by joining of the large 60S ribosomal subunit to form the 80S ribosome.

== Structure ==
Due to its size and complexity, the 43S PIC has eluded high resolution structural characterization. However, combined approaches including cryo-EM, cross-linking, and the structural characterization of individual components, has led to models for the complex organization.

== See also ==
- 40S ribosomal subunit
- eIF3
