= DHX29 =

Protein-coding gene in the species Homo sapiens

Identifiers
- Aliases: DHX29, DDX29, DEAH-box helicase 29, DExH-box helicase 29
- External IDs: OMIM: 612720; MGI: 2145374; GeneCards: DHX29
Enzyme activity
| EC # | BRENDA | ExPASy | KEGG | MetaCyc |
|---|---|---|---|---|
| 3.6.4.13 | ↗ | ↗ | ↗ | ↗ |

Gene location (Human)
| Chr. | Chromosome 5 (human) |
| Band | 5q11.2 | Start | 55,256,055 bp |
| Band | 5q11.2 | End | 55,307,694 bp |

Gene location (Mouse)
| Chr. | Chromosome 13 (mouse) |
| Band | 13|13 D2.2 | Start | 113,063,988 bp |
| Band | 13|13 D2.2 | End | 113,105,966 bp |
RNA expression pattern
| Bgee | Human / Mouse (ortholog); Top expressed in: palpebral conjunctiva; secondary oocyte; visceral pleura; seminal vesicula; parietal pleura; tibia; germinal epithelium; gums; biceps brachii; gingival epithelium / Top expressed in: superior cervical ganglion; hand; tail of embryo; genital tubercle; zygote; foot; otolith organ; utricle; epiblast; oocyte; More reference expression data |
| BioGPS | n/a |
Gene ontology
| Molecular function | translation initiation factor activity; ATP binding; hydrolase activity; nucleotide binding; nucleic acid binding; helicase activity; ribosomal small subunit binding; cadherin binding; RNA binding; RNA helicase activity; hydrolase activity, acting on acid anhydrides, in phosphorus-containing anhydrides; 3'-5' RNA helicase activity |
| Cellular component | cytoplasm; eukaryotic 43S preinitiation complex; mitochondrion |
| Biological process | RNA processing; translational initiation; protein biosynthesis; positive regulation of translational initiation |
Sources:Amigo / QuickGO
Orthologs
| Databases | NCBI: entry; OMA: entry |
| Species | Human | Mouse |
| Entrez | 54505 | 218629 |
| Ensembl | ENSG00000067248 | ENSMUSG00000042426 |
| UniProt | Q7Z478 | Q6PGC1 |
| RefSeq (mRNA) | NM_019030; NM_001345964; NM_001345965 | NM_172594 |
| RefSeq (protein) | NP_001332893; NP_001332894; NP_061903 | NP_766182 |
| Location (UCSC) | Chr 5: 55.26 – 55.31 Mb | Chr 13: 113.06 – 113.11 Mb |
| PubMed search |
- Wikidata
| View/Edit Human | View/Edit Mouse |

DExH-box helicase 29 (DHX29) is a 155 kDa protein that in humans is encoded by the DHX29 gene.

== Function ==
This gene encodes a member of the DEAH (Asp-Glu-Ala-His) subfamily of proteins, part of the DEAD (Asp-Glu-Ala-Asp) box family of RNA helicases. The encoded protein functions in translation initiation, and is specifically required for ribosomal scanning across stable mRNA secondary structures during initiation codon selection. This protein may also play a role in sensing virally derived cytosolic nucleic acids. Knockdown of this gene results in reduced protein translation and impaired proliferation of cancer cells.

== Interactions ==
DHX29 has been shown to interact with the eukaryotic small ribosomal subunit (40S) and eIF3.

== See also ==
- Eukaryotic translation
- DExD/H box proteins
- Ded1/DDX3
