= EIF4G2 =

Protein-coding gene in the species Homo sapiens

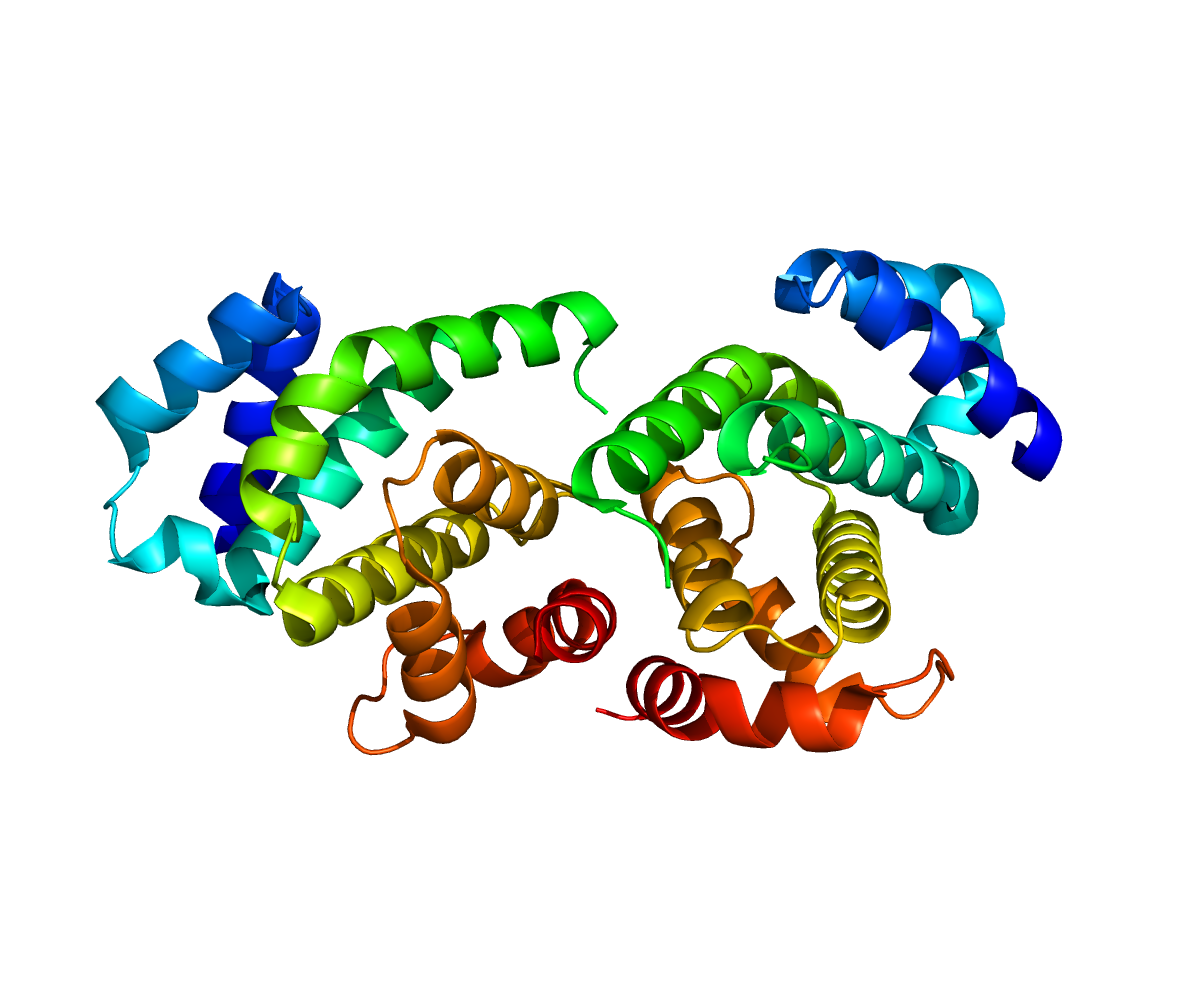

Identifiers
- Aliases: EIF4G2, AAG1, DAP5, NAT1, P97, eukaryotic translation initiation factor 4 gamma 2
- External IDs: OMIM: 602325; MGI: 109207; GeneCards: EIF4G2
Available structures
PDB	Ortholog search: PDBe RCSB
PDB	List of PDB id codes 3D3M, 3L6A, 4IUL

Gene location (Human)
Chr.	Chromosome 11 (human)
Band	11p15.4	Start	10,797,050 bp
Band	11p15.4	End	10,808,940 bp

Gene location (Mouse)
Chr.	Chromosome 7 (mouse)
Band	7 E3|7 58.0 cM	Start	110,666,957 bp
Band	7 E3|7 58.0 cM	End	110,682,237 bp
RNA expression pattern
Bgee	Human / Mouse (ortholog); Top expressed in: visceral pleura; germinal epithelium; parietal pleura; gingival epithelium; tibia; ganglionic eminence; epithelium of colon; ventricular zone; superficial temporal artery; epithelium of nasopharynx / Top expressed in: tail of embryo; renal corpuscle; genital tubercle; Gonadal ridge; molar; Rostral migratory stream; conjunctival fornix; retinal pigment epithelium; ciliary body; migratory enteric neural crest cell; More reference expression data
BioGPS	n/a
Gene ontology
Molecular function	translation factor activity, RNA binding; protein binding; translation initiation factor activity; RNA binding; cadherin binding; mRNA binding
Cellular component	cytosol; eukaryotic translation initiation factor 4F complex; membrane
Biological process	translational initiation; cell death; protein biosynthesis; regulation of translation; regulation of translational initiation; negative regulation of autophagy; positive regulation of cell growth; cellular macromolecule biosynthetic process
Sources:Amigo / QuickGO
Orthologs
Databases	NCBI: entry; OMA: entry
Species	Human	Mouse
Entrez	1982	13690
Ensembl	ENSG00000110321	ENSMUSG00000005610
UniProt	P78344	Q62448
RefSeq (mRNA)	NM_001418; NM_001042559; NM_001172705	NM_001040131; NM_013507
RefSeq (protein)	NP_001036024; NP_001166176; NP_001409	NP_001035221; NP_038535
Location (UCSC)	Chr 11: 10.8 – 10.81 Mb	Chr 7: 110.67 – 110.68 Mb
PubMed search
- Wikidata
View/Edit Human	View/Edit Mouse

Eukaryotic translation initiation factor 4 gamma 2 (also called p97, NAT1, and DAP-5) is a protein that in humans is encoded by the EIF4G2 gene.

== Function ==
Translation initiation is mediated by specific recognition of the cap structure by eukaryotic translation initiation factor 4F (eIF4F), which is a cap binding protein complex that consists of three subunits: eIF4A, eIF4E and eIF4G. The protein encoded by the eIF4G2 gene shares similarity with the C-terminal region of eIF4G1 that contains the binding sites for eIF4A and eIF3. eIF4G2 additionally contains a binding site for eIF4E at the N-terminus. Unlike eIF4G1, which supports cap-dependent and independent translation, the eIF4G2 gene product functions as a general repressor of translation by forming translationally inactive complexes. Other studies have shown that eIF4G2 can promote re-initiation and translation of the main ORF on uORF-containing mRNAs In vitro and in vivo studies indicate that translation of this mRNA initiates exclusively at a non-AUG (GUG) codon. Alternatively spliced transcript variants encoding different isoforms of this gene have been described.

== Interactions ==
EIF4G2 has been shown to interact with EIF3A.
