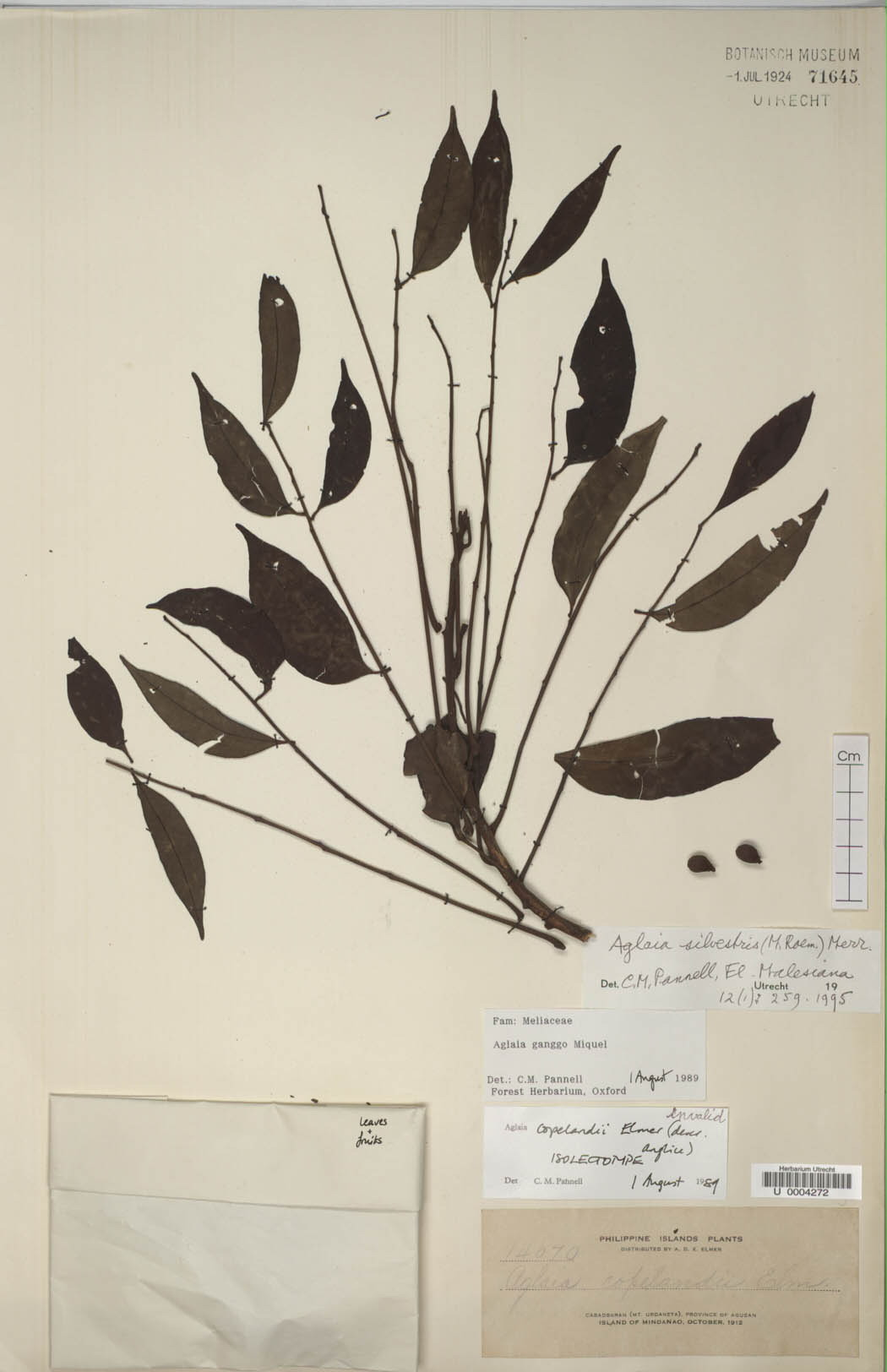
- Herbarium specimen of Aglaia silvestris

Conservation status
- Near Threatened (IUCN 2.3)

Scientific classification
- Kingdom: Plantae
- Clade: Tracheophytes
- Clade: Angiosperms
- Clade: Eudicots
- Clade: Rosids
- Order: Sapindales
- Family: Meliaceae
- Genus: Aglaia
- Species: A. silvestris

Binomial name
- Aglaia silvestris (M.Roemer) Merr.

= Aglaia silvestris =

Species of flowering plant

Aglaia silvestris is a species of plant in the family Meliaceae. It is found in Cambodia, India, Indonesia, Malaysia, Papua New Guinea, the Philippines, the Solomon Islands, Thailand, and Vietnam. This plant initiated the naming of the Rocaglamide derivatives silvestrol and episilvestrol. In fact they were derived from the fruits and twigs of Aglaia foveolata.
