= FL3 =

FL3, FL-3, or similar may refer to:

- FL3 (flavagline), an organic compound that displays potent anticancer and cardioprotectant activities
- FL3 (Lazio regional railways)
- AVIA FL.3, an Italian two-seat cabin monoplane
- Florida State Road 3, also known as North Courtenay Parkway, a north–south road serving as the southern access for the Kennedy Space Center near Cape Canaveral, Florida
- Florida's 3rd congressional district, a congressional district in the U.S. state of Florida
