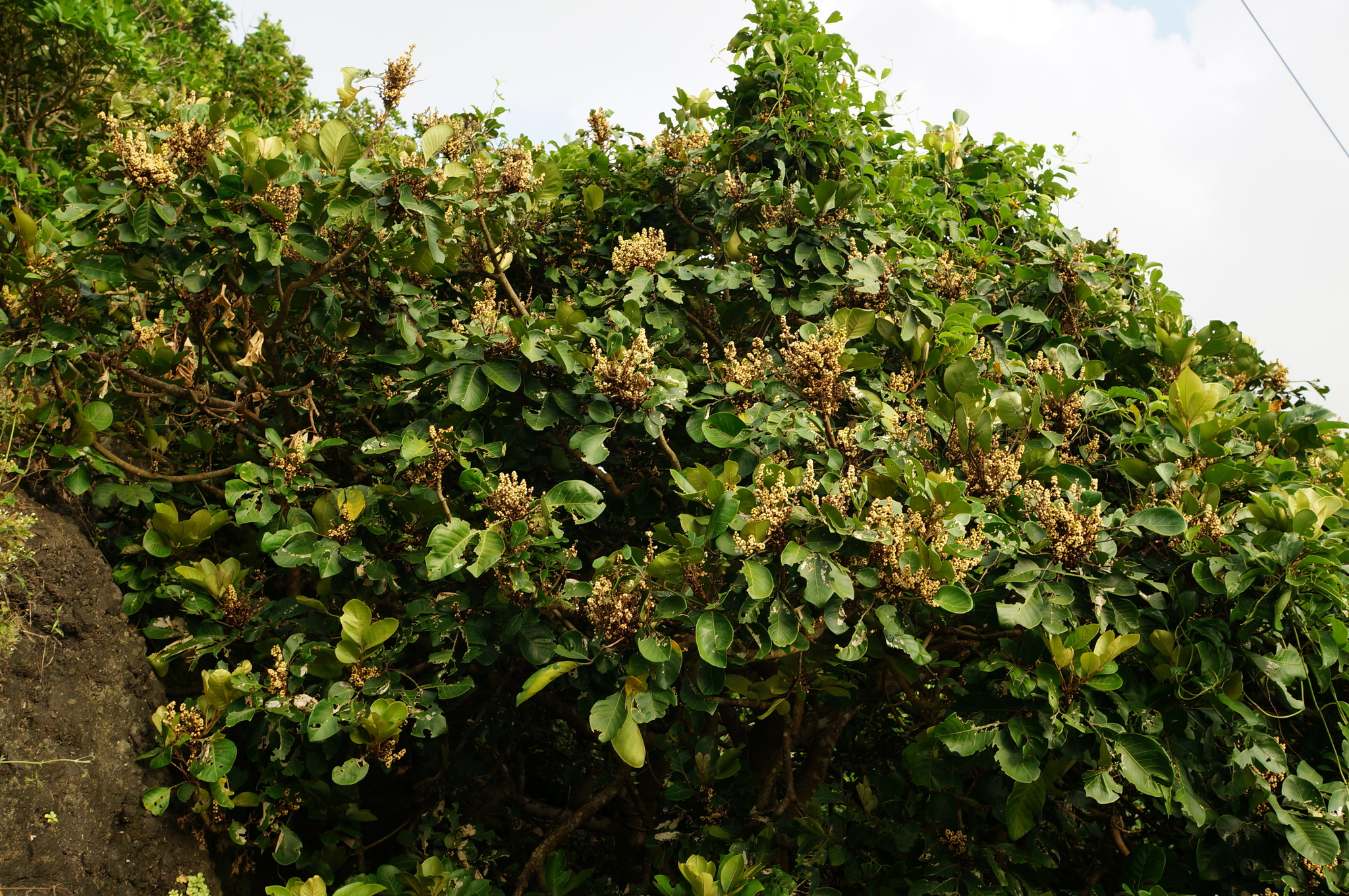
- In Taitung, Taiwan

Conservation status
- Near Threatened (IUCN 2.3)

Scientific classification
- Kingdom: Plantae
- Clade: Tracheophytes
- Clade: Angiosperms
- Clade: Eudicots
- Clade: Rosids
- Order: Sapindales
- Family: Meliaceae
- Genus: Aglaia
- Species: A. rimosa

Binomial name
- Aglaia rimosa (Blanco) Merr.

Synonyms
- Aglaia batjanica Miq.; Aglaia bulusanensis Elmer ex Merr.; Aglaia denticulata Turcz.; Aglaia diffusiflora Merr.; Aglaia elliptifolia Merr.; Aglaia goebeliana Warb.; Aglaia hexandra Turcz.; Aglaia lanceolata Merr.; Aglaia llanosiana C.DC.; Aglaia loheri Merr.; Aglaia macrobotrys Turcz.; Aglaia reticulata Elmer; Aglaia subviridis Elmer; Portesia rimosa Blanco

= Aglaia rimosa =

Species of flowering plant

Aglaia rimosa is an evergreen small tree in the family Meliaceae. It is found in Indonesia, Papua New Guinea, the Philippines, and Taiwan (Hengchun Peninsula and Orchid Island ). Aglaia rimosa "grows primarily in the wet tropical biome".The official name of Aglaia rimosa in Taiwan is Large-leaved aglaia, because compared with the other two species native to Taiwan, Aglaia elaeagnoidea and Aglaias chittagonga, the leaflet of Aglaia rimosa is larger than their leaflet, all three are imparipinnate.The flowers of Aglaia rimosa have fragrance, but it is lighter than that of Aglaia odorata.The anticancer compound Rocaglamide (RocA) was originally extracted from Aglaia rimosa by researchers in Taiwan.

== Uses ==
- The Tao people on Orchid Island use Aglaia rimosa to make boat rowlock or pillars for houses.This is probably why the Tao people called it "maraboa"/four limbs towards the sky.
- The fruit of Aglaia rimosa is edible.
- Aglaia rimosa is also an easy-to-cultivate landscape plant.
- Aglaia rimosa has anticancer components: rocaglamide.

== Gallery ==
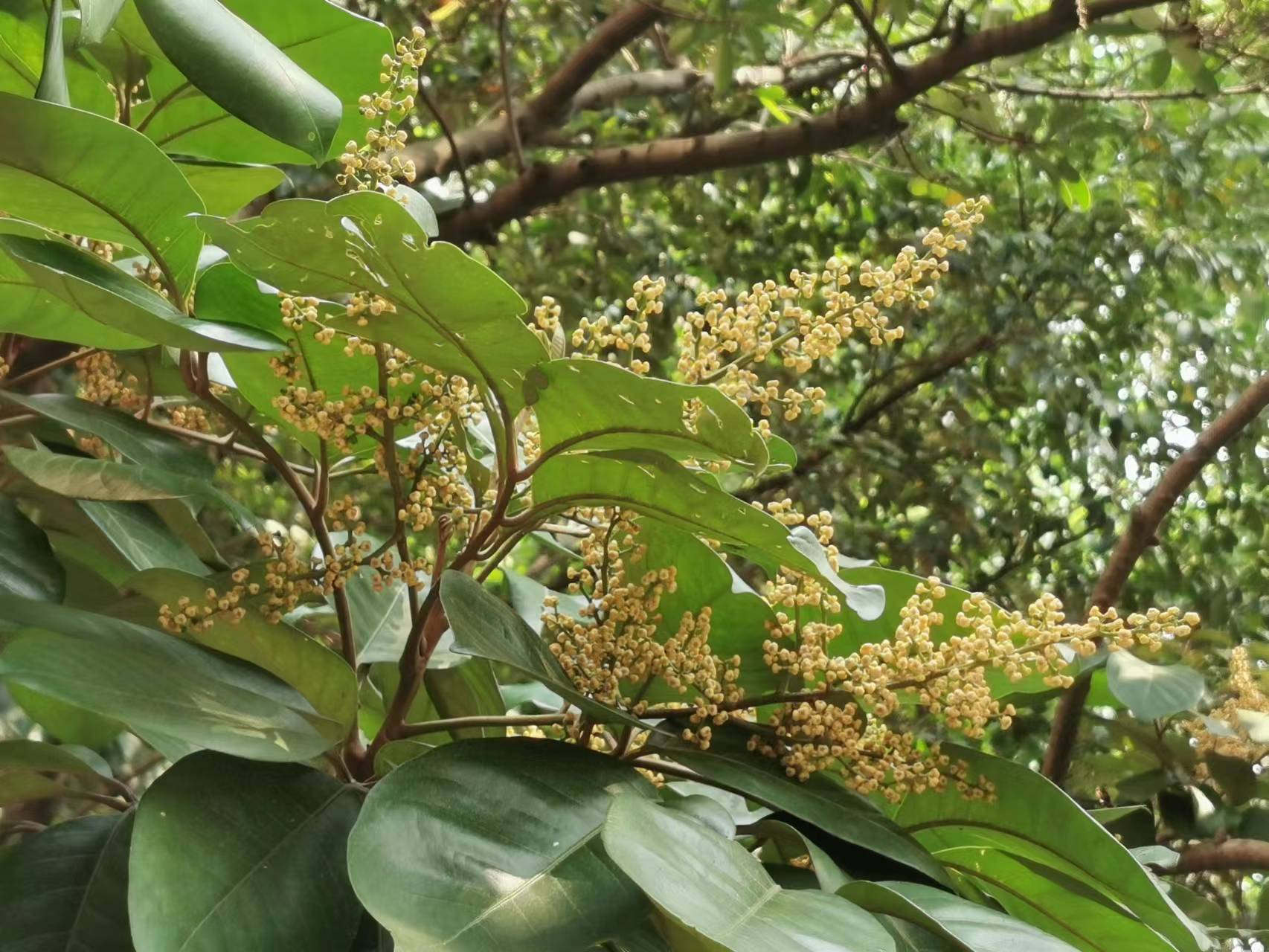
Panicles axillary

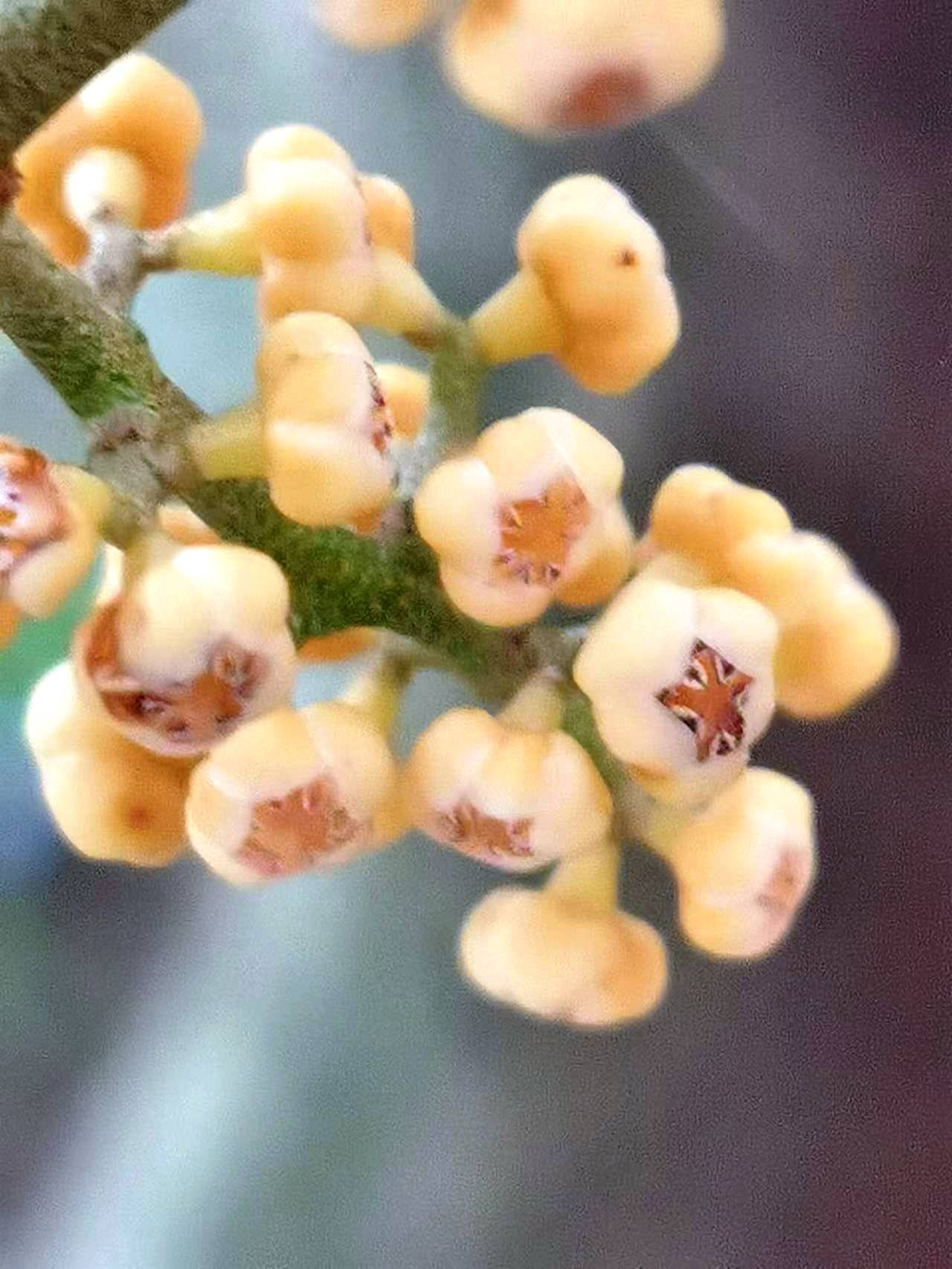
Branchlets densely brown lepidote

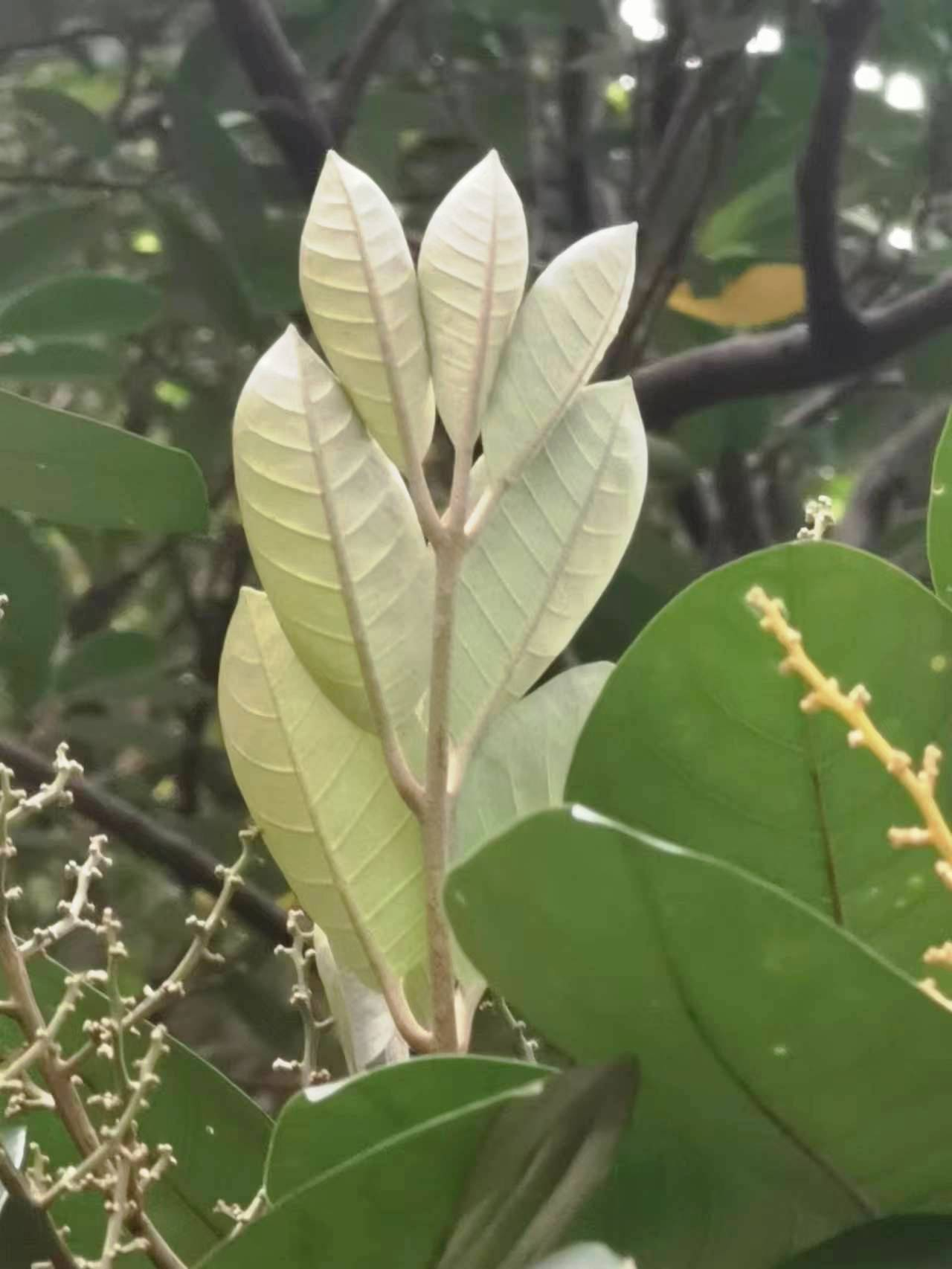
Leaves imparipinnate
