= EIF4A =

Protein family

eukaryotic translation initiation factor 4A, isoform 1

Identifiers
- Symbol: EIF4A1
- Alt. symbols: EIF4A
- NCBI gene: 1973
- HGNC: 3282
- OMIM: 602641
- RefSeq: NM_001416
- UniProt: P60842

Other data
- Locus: Chr. 17 p13
Search for
- Structures: Swiss-model
- Domains: InterPro

eukaryotic translation initiation factor 4A, isoform 2

Identifiers
- Symbol: EIF4A2
- Alt. symbols: EIF4F
- NCBI gene: 1974
- HGNC: 3284
- OMIM: 601102
- RefSeq: NM_001967
- UniProt: Q14240

Other data
- EC number: 3.6.1.1
- Locus: Chr. 3 q28
Search for
- Structures: Swiss-model
- Domains: InterPro

eukaryotic translation initiation factor 4A, isoform 3

Identifiers
- Symbol: EIF4A3
- Alt. symbols: DDX48
- NCBI gene: 9775
- HGNC: 18683
- OMIM: 608546
- RefSeq: NM_014740
- UniProt: P38919

Other data
- Locus: Chr. 17 q25.3
Search for
- Structures: Swiss-model
- Domains: InterPro

The eukaryotic initiation factor-4A (eIF4A) family consists of 3 closely related proteins EIF4A1, EIF4A2, and EIF4A3. These factors are required for the binding of mRNA to 40S ribosomal subunits. In addition these proteins are helicases that function to unwind double-stranded RNA.

== Background ==
The mechanisms governing the basic subsistence of eukaryotic cells are immensely complex; it is therefore unsurprising that regulation occurs at a number of stages of protein synthesis – the regulation of translation has become a well-studied field. Human translational control is of increasing research interest as it has connotations in a range of diseases. Orthologs of many of the factors involved in human translation are shared by a range of eukaryotic organisms; some of which are used as model systems for the investigation of translation initiation and elongation, for example: sea urchin eggs upon fertilization, rodent brain and rabbit reticulocytes. Monod and Jacob were among the first to propose that "the synthesis of individual proteins may be provoked or suppressed within a cell, under the influence of specific external agents, and the relative rates at which different proteins may be profoundly altered, depending upon external conditions". Almost half a century after the flurry of postulations arising from the revelation of the central dogma of molecular biology, of which the preceding supposition by Monod and Jacob is an example; contemporary researchers still have much to learn about the modulation of genetic expression. Synthesis of protein from mature messenger RNA in eukaryotes is divided into translation initiation, elongation, and termination of these stages; the initiation of translation is the rate limiting step. Within the process of translation initiation; the bottleneck occurs shortly before the ribosome binds to the 5’ m7GTP facilitated by a number of proteins; it is at this stage that constrictions born of stress, amino acid starvation etc. take effect.

== Function ==
Eukaryotic initiation factor complex 2 (eIF2) forms a ternary complex with GTP and the initiator Met-tRNA – this process is regulated by guanine nucleotide exchange and phosphorylation and serves as the main regulatory element of the bottleneck of gene expression. Before translation can progress to the elongation stage, a number of initiation factors must facilitate the synergy of the ribosome and the mRNA and ensure that the 5’ UTR of the mRNA is sufficiently devoid of secondary structure. Binding in this way is facilitated by group 4 eukaryotic initiation factors; eIF4F (eIF4A + 4E + 4G) has implications in the normal regulation of translation as well as the transformation and progression of cancerous cells; as such, it represents an interesting field of research.

In addition to participating in eIF4F, another copy of eIF4A is present at the mRNA entrance tunnel, presumably to unwind any secondary structure of the mRNA.

== Mechanism ==
The repertoire of compounds involved in eukaryotic translation consists of initiation factor classes 1 – 6; eIF4F is responsible for the binding of capped mRNA to the 40S ribosomal subunit via eIF3. The mRNA cap is bound by eIF4E (25 kDa), eIF4G (185 kDa) acts as a scaffold for the complex whilst the ATP-dependent RNA helicase eIF4A (46 kDa) processes the secondary structure of the mRNA 5’ UTR to render it more conducive to ribosomal binding and subsequent translation. Together these three proteins are referred to as eIF4F. For maximal activity; eIF4A also requires eIF4B (80 kDa), which itself is enhanced by eIF4H (25 kDa). A study conducted by Bi et al. in wheat germ seemed to indicate that eIF4A has a higher binding affinity for ADP than ATP except in the presence of eIF4B, which increased the ATP binding affinity tenfold without affecting ADP affinity. Once bound to the 5’ cap of mRNA, this 48S complex then searches for the (usually) AUG start codon and translation begins.

== Genes ==
In humans, the gene encoding EIF4A1 has a transcript length of 1741bp, contains 11 exons, and is located on chromosome 17. The genes for human paralogs II and III reside on chromosomes 3 and 17 respectively.

== Proteins ==
The 407 residue, 46 kDa, protein eIF4A is the prototypical member of the DEAD box helicase family, so-called due to their conserved four-residue D-E-A-D sequence. This family of helicases is found in a range of prokaryotic and eukaryotic organisms including humans, wherein they catalyse a variety of processes including embryogenesis and RNA splicing as well as translation initiation. Crystallographic analysis of yeast eIF4A carried out by Carruthers et al. (2000) revealed that the molecule is approximately 80 Å in length and has a “dumbbell” shape where the proximal section represents an 11 residue (18 Å) linker postulated to confer a degree of flexibility and distension to the molecule in solution. eIF4A is an abundant cytoplasmic protein.

Three isoforms (specifically, paralogs) of eIF4A exist in humans; I and II share 95% amino acid similarity and have been found simultaneously in rabbit reticulocyte eIF4F in a ratio of 4:1, respectively. The third paralog; eIF4A III, which shares only 65% similarity to the other paralogs is believed to be a core component of the exon junction complex involved in pre-mRNA splicing.

== See also ==
- Eukaryotic initiation factor
- Eukaryotic initiation factor 4F (eIF4F)
- Hippuristanol
- Rocaglamide
