= ALH =

ALH may refer to:

- Acta Linguistica Hafniensia, a linguistics journal
- Advanced Light Helicopter known as HAL Dhruv
- Albany Airport (Australia), IATA code
- ALH84001, a Martian meteorite
- Atypical lobular hyperplasia, a breast disease
