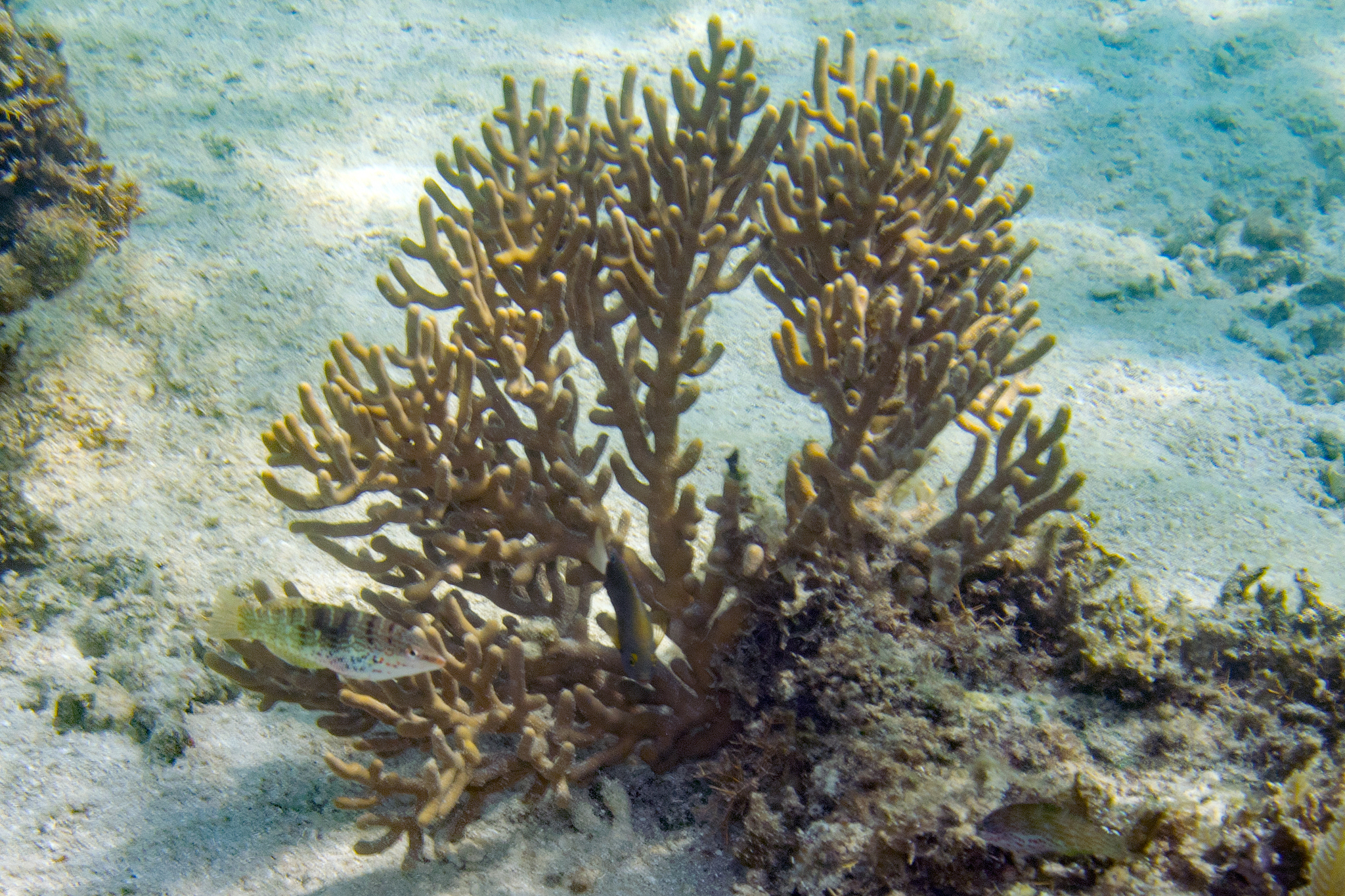

Scientific classification
- Kingdom: Animalia
- Phylum: Cnidaria
- Subphylum: Anthozoa
- Class: Octocorallia
- Order: Malacalcyonacea
- Family: Isididae
- Genus: Isis
- Species: I. hippuris

Binomial name
- Isis hippuris Linnaeus, 1758

= Isis hippuris =

Species of coral

Isis hippuris, also known as sea bamboo (though this common name is ambiguous), is a species of bamboo coral found in the Western Pacific Ocean, commonly near the coasts of Indonesia. I. hippuris reproduce asexually, and is abundant throughout its habitats in Indonesia. For centuries, I. hippuris has been identified by its bamboo or bony-looking structure. Additionally, it is notable for producing Hippuristanol, a molecule that could potentially have anti-cancer applications. While no actual conclusion regarding Hippuristanol in I. hippuris has been published, scientists and marine biologists continue to study how the molecule could be used in cancer research and recovery. Although only found in the Western Pacific Ocean, I. hippuris is highly sought after across the globe, and is seen as a symbol of beauty.

== Description ==
I. hippurisis a soft coral identified by its yellow-green coloration and thick stalks with a fuzzy appearance. Colonies of I. hippuris commonly grow to a height of 30–40 cm and a width of 10–20 cm, but colonies have been recorded growing to 100 cm in either dimension. The physical structure of I. hippuris is composed of nodes and inter nodes, essentially "stacked" on top of each other, giving it the nickname sea bamboo. Together, the nodes and inter nodes can create either a skinny or thick structure, and oftentimes look similar to many organism's spine. With this, the I. hippuris coral have also been referred to as "the stony horse-tail", as their structure is their main distinguished identifying characteristic.

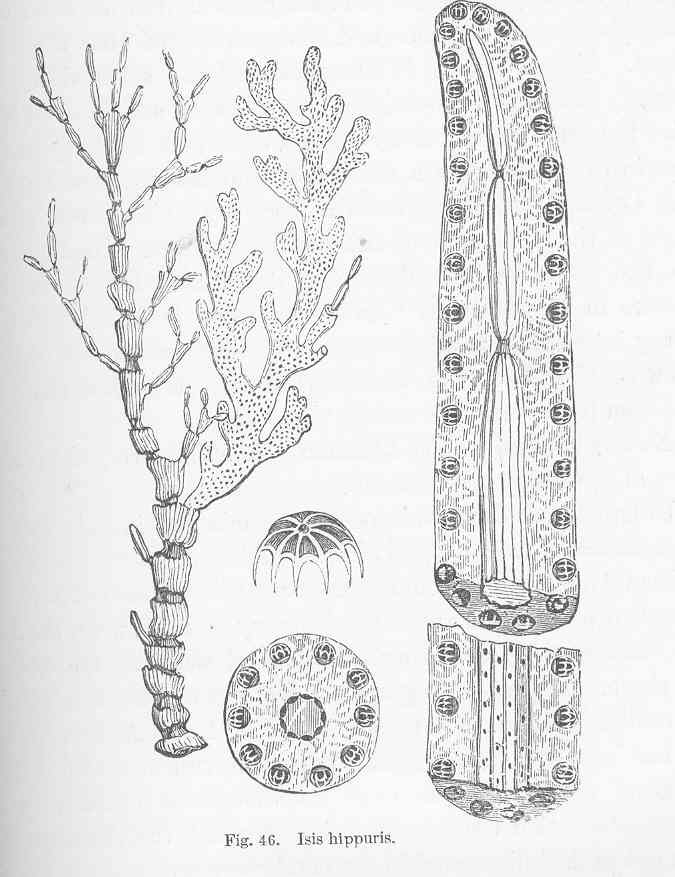
A diagram of Isis hippuris by Louis Fibuier

A 2015 study on the nodes and inter nodes in I. hippuris showed that it may display multiple phenotypes depending on its environment. The study compared groups of I. hippuris located at two different ridges with Wakatobi Marine National Park (WMNP), Indonesia. The ridges differed in sediment thickness, height, and color. One phenotype displayed shorter, stockier branches, while the other had longer, thinner branches. It is not entirely clear if these differences indicate differing phenotypes, or if the two ridges contain distinct species.

=== Habitat and Distribution ===
I. hippuris is found in tropical coral reefs within the Indo-Pacific region of the Pacific Ocean, particularly off the coasts of Indonesia and India. I. hippuris may be adaptable to its environment, as factors such as sediment thickness, turbidity, and light availability may be linked to phenotypic differences. It has been found that specimens of I. hippuris with longer stalks and more vertical profiles are commonly found at the flats of reefs, while specimens with shorter stalks and more horizontal profiles are found at the crests.

I. hippuris is one of many Gorgonian corals found throughout Indo-Pacific coral reefs. Gorgonian corals are oftentimes dominant members of the benthic communities they're found in, acting almost as centerpieces for the reefs.

Like most Gorgonians, I. hippuris prefers areas with loose substrates and strong water flow. It seems that areas with differing underwater elevations are ideal for diverse groups of Gorgonians, both in regards to overall species richness and differing phenotypes of I. hippuris. Areas with high turbidity and sedimentation are not suitable for Gorgonians.

=== Feeding ===
Isis hippuris is a suspension feeder, using their stalks to catch food from the water flow. The differing appearances of I. hippuris stalks can possibly be attributed to this, as longer stalks are more efficient at lower elevations with more competition close to the ground, and shorter, more lateral specimens would excel at the peak of the ridges.

== Reproduction ==
Like other members of the class Anthozoa, I. hippuris is able to reproduce asexually, spawning small larva which go through metamorphosis quickly and take root in sediment to grow into an adult.

== Relation to humans ==
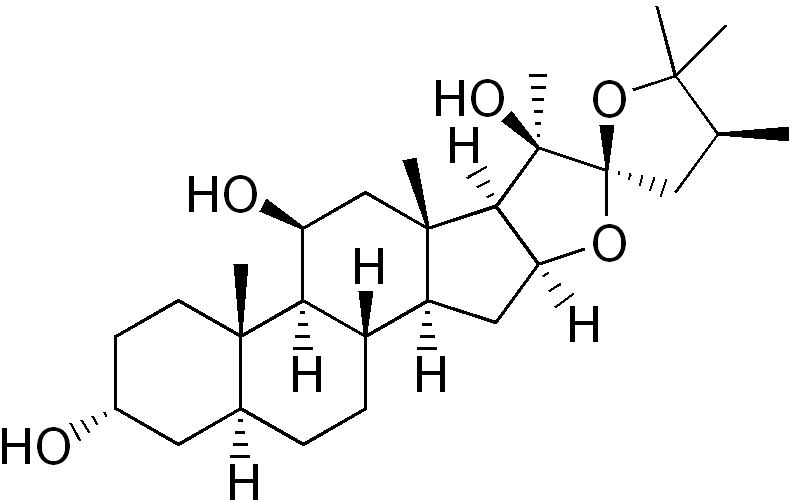
Hippuristanol

The molecule Hippuristanol present in I. hippuris continues to be studied as a hypothetical approach to leukemia treatment. Hippuristanol is polyoxygenated, and is able to target and diminish the spread and presence of T-cell leukemia in organisms. Researchers have broken down the chemical makeup and studied the functions of Isis hippuris in order to truly determine if there is a correlation between the steroid hippuristanol, and the reduced number of leukemia cells in an organism exposed to hippuristanol. Continuing to research the rate at which hippuristanol is able to eliminate leukemia, and the effectiveness, may ultimately result in a major medical breakthrough.

=== Conservation Status ===
As I. hippuris is found primarily in coral reefs, it has been affected by the overall destruction of coral reefs by man. The Wakatobi Marine National Park, I. hippuris's main habitat, is in theory protected by local government from destructive actions, but in practice the protection is not properly enforced. Additionally, there is a lack of education provided to the local community about the importance of these coral reefs for the worldwide ecosystem, which also contributes to its destruction.

In addition to the typical endangerment that a coral would receive from mankind, I. hippuris has also been sought after and collected for its medicinal purposes. The Indonesian government has placed a protective ban on the collection of I. hippuris, in attempts to let the species re-flourish.
