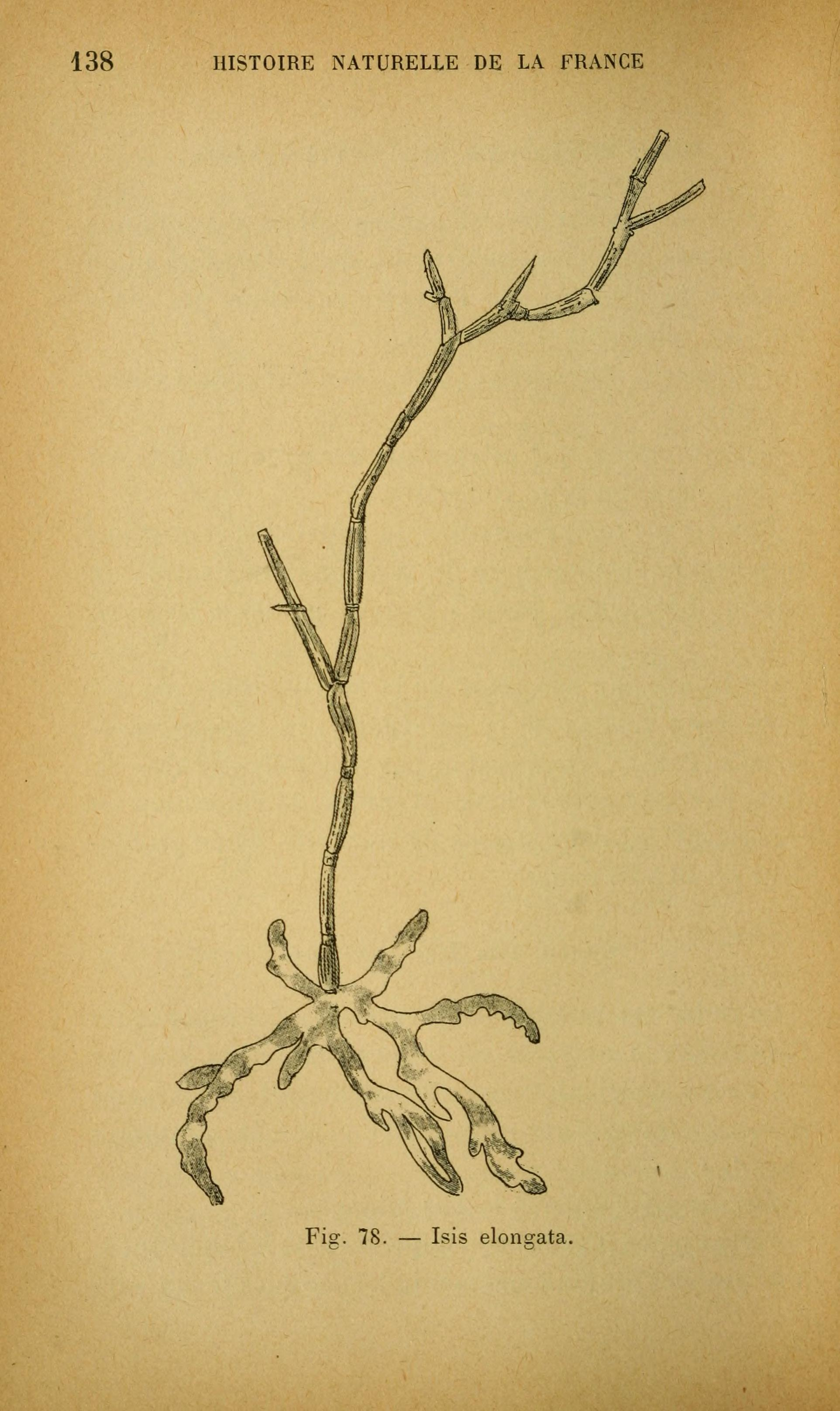
- Isis elongata

Scientific classification
- Kingdom: Animalia
- Phylum: Cnidaria
- Subphylum: Anthozoa
- Class: Octocorallia
- Order: Malacalcyonacea
- Family: Isididae
- Genus: Isis; Linnaeus, 1758

Species
- Isis elongata Gray, 1857; Isis hippuris Linnaeus, 1758; Isis minorbrachyblasta Zou, Huang & Wang, 1991; Isis reticulata Nutting, 1910; ...see article text

= Isis (coral) =

Genus of corals

Isis is a genus of coral in the family Isididae.

== Species ==
The accepted species in the genus are:

- Isis compressa Duncan, 1880 †
- Isis danae Duncan, 1880 †
- Isis elongata Duncan, 1880 †
- Isis elongata Gray, 1857
- Isis gracilis Reuss, 1872 †
- Isis hippuris Linnaeus, 1758
- Isis melittensis Goldfuss, 1829 †
- Isis minorbrachyblasta Zou, Huang & Wang, 1991
- Isis miranda Počta, 1887 †
- Isis reticulata Nutting, 1910
- Isis steenstrupi Nielsen, 1913 †
- Isis tenuistriata Reuss, 1872 †
- Isis vertebralis Hennig, 1899 †
