= EIF4A3 =

Protein-coding gene in the species Homo sapiens

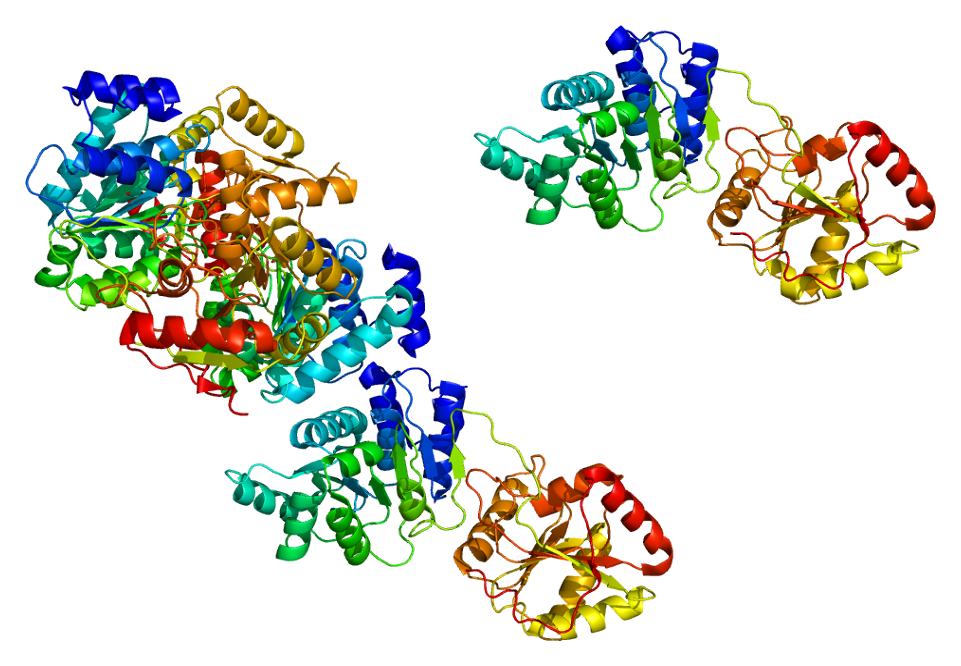

Identifiers
- Aliases: EIF4A3, DDX48, MUK34, NMP265, NUK34, RCPS, eIF4AIII, eukaryotic translation initiation factor 4A3, Fal1, eIF4A-III, eIF-4A-III
- External IDs: OMIM: 608546; MGI: 1923731; GeneCards: EIF4A3
Available structures
PDB	Ortholog search: PDBe RCSB
PDB	List of PDB id codes 2HXY, 2HYI, 2J0Q, 2J0S, 2J0U, 2XB2, 3EX7, 4C9B
Enzyme activity
EC #	BRENDA	ExPASy	KEGG	MetaCyc
3.6.4.13	↗	↗	↗	↗

Gene location (Human)
Chr.	Chromosome 17 (human)
Band	17q25.3	Start	80,134,369 bp
Band	17q25.3	End	80,147,151 bp

Gene location (Mouse)
Chr.	Chromosome 11 (mouse)
Band	11|11 E2	Start	119,179,189 bp
Band	11|11 E2	End	119,190,915 bp
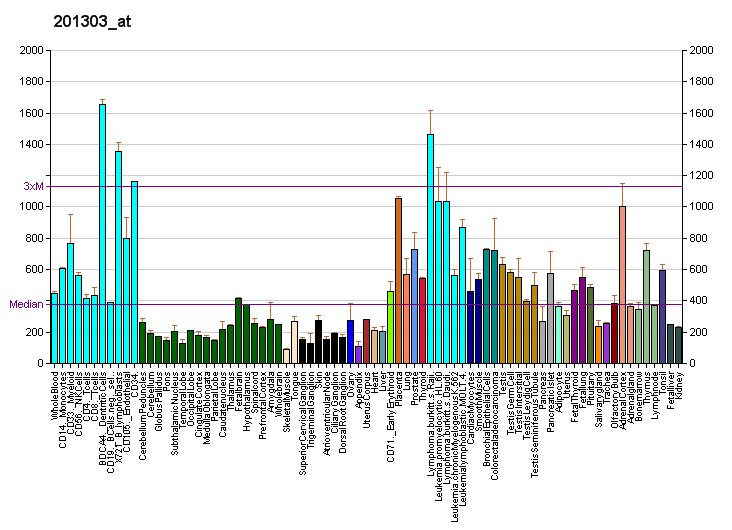
RNA expression pattern
Bgee	Human / Mouse (ortholog); Top expressed in: beta cell; gonad; left uterine tube; mucosa of pharynx; olfactory bulb; ventricular zone; mucosa of esophagus; mucosa of urinary bladder; gingival epithelium; left ovary / Top expressed in: morula; epiblast; embryo; primary oocyte; embryo; neural tube; ventricular zone; thymus; mesencephalon; spleen; More reference expression data
BioGPS	More reference expression data
Gene ontology
Molecular function	nucleotide binding; selenocysteine insertion sequence binding; helicase activity; poly(A) binding; RNA stem-loop binding; protein binding; nucleic acid binding; ribonucleoprotein complex binding; hydrolase activity; ATP binding; mRNA binding; RNA binding; translation regulator activity
Cellular component	cytoplasm; cytosol; nuclear speck; catalytic step 2 spliceosome; membrane; exon-exon junction complex; soma; dendrite; spliceosomal complex; nucleus; nucleoplasm; nucleolus; glutamatergic synapse; postsynaptic cytosol; ribonucleoprotein complex; U2-type catalytic step 1 spliceosome
Biological process	nuclear-transcribed mRNA poly(A) tail shortening; mRNA transport; negative regulation of translation; associative learning; response to organic cyclic compound; regulation of mRNA binding; mRNA processing; positive regulation of translation; negative regulation of gene expression; negative regulation of excitatory postsynaptic potential; cellular response to brain-derived neurotrophic factor stimulus; cellular response to selenite ion; exploration behavior; RNA secondary structure unwinding; RNA splicing; rRNA processing; embryonic cranial skeleton morphogenesis; negative regulation of selenocysteine insertion sequence binding; nuclear-transcribed mRNA catabolic process, nonsense-mediated decay; regulation of translation; negative regulation of selenocysteine incorporation; mRNA splicing, via spliceosome; RNA export from nucleus; termination of RNA polymerase II transcription; mRNA export from nucleus; mRNA 3'-end processing; positive regulation of transcription by RNA polymerase II; positive regulation of mRNA splicing, via spliceosome; transport; regulation of translation at postsynapse, modulating synaptic transmission
Sources:Amigo / QuickGO
Orthologs
Databases	NCBI: entry; OMA: entry
Species	Human	Mouse
Entrez	9775	192170
Ensembl	ENSG00000141543	ENSMUSG00000025580
UniProt	P38919	Q91VC3
RefSeq (mRNA)	NM_014740	NM_138669
RefSeq (protein)	NP_055555	NP_619610
Location (UCSC)	Chr 17: 80.13 – 80.15 Mb	Chr 11: 119.18 – 119.19 Mb
PubMed search
- Wikidata
View/Edit Human	View/Edit Mouse

Eukaryotic initiation factor 4A-III is a protein that in humans is encoded by the EIF4A3 gene.

== Function ==
This gene encodes a member of the DEAD box protein family. DEAD box proteins, characterized by the conserved motif Asp-Glu-Ala-Asp (DEAD), are putative RNA helicases. They are implicated in a number of cellular processes involving alteration of RNA secondary structure, such as translation initiation, nuclear and mitochondrial splicing, and ribosome and spliceosome assembly. Based on their distribution patterns, some members of this family are believed to be involved in embryogenesis, spermatogenesis, and cellular growth and division. The protein encoded by this gene is a nuclear matrix protein. Its amino acid sequence is highly similar to the amino acid sequences of the translation initiation factors eIF4A-I and eIF4A-II, two other members of the DEAD box protein family.
