= EIF4EBP3 =

Protein-coding gene in the species Homo sapiens

Identifiers
- Aliases: EIF4EBP3, 4E-BP3, 4EBP3, eukaryotic translation initiation factor 4E binding protein 3
- External IDs: OMIM: 603483; MGI: 1270847; HomoloGene: 37841; GeneCards: EIF4EBP3; OMA:EIF4EBP3 - orthologs

Gene location (Human)
Chr.	Chromosome 5 (human)
Band	5q31.3	Start	140,547,662 bp
Band	5q31.3	End	140,549,576 bp

Gene location (Mouse)
Chr.	Chromosome 18 (mouse)
Band	18|18 B2	Start	36,797,113 bp
Band	18|18 B2	End	36,798,970 bp
RNA expression pattern
Bgee	Human / Mouse (ortholog); Top expressed in: right uterine tube; gastrocnemius muscle; olfactory zone of nasal mucosa; muscle of thigh; right adrenal cortex; body of stomach; left adrenal cortex; minor salivary glands; fundus; skin of leg / Top expressed in: ileum; renal cortex; proximal tubule; bone marrow; right kidney; liver; colon; jejunum; duodenum; human kidney; More reference expression data
BioGPS	n/a
Gene ontology
Molecular function	protein binding; eukaryotic initiation factor 4E binding; translation repressor activity
Cellular component	cytoplasm; eukaryotic translation initiation factor 4F complex; membrane
Biological process	negative regulation of translation; regulation of translation; negative regulation of translational initiation
Sources:Amigo / QuickGO
Orthologs
Species	Human	Mouse
Entrez	8637	108112
Ensembl	ENSG00000243056	ENSMUSG00000090264
UniProt	O60516	Q80VV3
RefSeq (mRNA)	NM_003732	NM_201256
RefSeq (protein)	NP_003723	NP_957708
Location (UCSC)	Chr 5: 140.55 – 140.55 Mb	Chr 18: 36.8 – 36.8 Mb
PubMed search
- Wikidata
View/Edit Human	View/Edit Mouse

Eukaryotic translation initiation factor 4E-binding protein 3 is a protein that in humans is encoded by the EIF4EBP3 gene.

== Function ==
This gene encodes a member of the EIF4EBP family which derives its name from proteins that bind to eukaryotic initiation factor 4E and that prevent its assembly into EIF4F. Co-transcription of this gene and the neighboring upstream gene (MASK) generates a transcript (MASK-BP3) which encodes a fusion protein composed of the MASK protein sequence for the majority of the protein and a different C-terminus due to an alternate reading frame for the EIF4EBP3 segments.

== Interactions ==
EIF4EBP3 has been shown to interact with EIF4E.
