= Silvestrol =

Chemical compound

Identifiers
- IUPAC name: Methyl (1R,2R,3S,3aR,8bS)-6-[[(2S,3R,6R)-6-[(1R)-1,2-dihydroxyethyl]-3-methoxy-1,4-dioxan-2-yl]oxy]-1,8b-dihydroxy-8-methoxy-3a-(4-methoxyphenyl)-3-phenyl-2,3-dihydro-1H-cyclopenta[b][1]benzofuran-2-carboxylate
- CAS Number: 697235-38-4
- PubChem CID: 11787114
- ChemSpider: 9961792
- UNII: KK3Y3KN5BV
- ChEBI: CHEBI:66484
- ChEMBL: ChEMBL555196

Chemical and physical data
- Formula: C_{34}H_{38}O_{13}
- Molar mass: 654.665 g·mol^{−1}
- 3D model (JSmol): Interactive image
- SMILES: CO[C@H]1[C@@H](O[C@H](CO1)[C@@H](CO)O)OC2=CC3=C(C(=C2)OC)[C@@]4([C@@H]([C@@H]([C@H]([C@@]4(O3)C5=CC=C(C=C5)OC)C6=CC=CC=C6)C(=O)OC)O)O
- InChI: InChI=1S/C34H38O13/c1-40-20-12-10-19(11-13-20)34-27(18-8-6-5-7-9-18)26(30(38)42-3)29(37)33(34,39)28-23(41-2)14-21(15-24(28)47-34)45-32-31(43-4)44-17-25(46-32)22(36)16-35/h5-15,22,25-27,29,31-32,35-37,39H,16-17H2,1-4H3/t22-,25-,26-,27-,29-,31-,32-,33+,34+/m1/s1; Key:GVKXFVCXBFGBCD-QKDMMWSPSA-N

Silvestrol is a natural product from the flavagline family, with a cyclopenta[b] benzofuran core structure and an unusual dioxane ether side chain, which is found in the bark of trees from the genus Aglaia, especially Aglaia silvestris and Aglaia foveolata.

== Bioactivity ==
It acts as a potent and selective inhibitor of the RNA helicase enzyme eIF4A, and has both broad-spectrum antiviral activity against diseases such as Ebola and coronaviruses, and anti-cancer properties, which makes it of considerable interest in medical research. However, as it cannot be extracted from tree bark in commercial amounts and is prohibitively complex to produce synthetically, practical applications have focused more on structurally simplified analogues such as CR-31-B.

== See also ==
- Rocaglamide
