= Flavagline =

Chemical structure of the flavagline FL3

Flavaglines are a family of natural products that are found in plants of the genus Aglaia (Meliaceae). These compounds are characterized by a cyclopenta[b]benzofuran skeleton. In 1982 King and colleagues discovered the first member of this family, rocaglamide, based on its antileukemic activity. Since then, about 50 other flavaglines have been characterized. These molecules display strong insecticidal, antifungal, anti-inflammatory, neuroprotective, cardioprotective and anticancer activities. In mouse models of cancer, flavaglines enhance the efficacy of chemotherapies and also alleviate the cardiac adverse effect of these chemotherapies.

The challenge raised by their structural complexity has attracted the attention of some organic chemists. In 1990, Barry Trost presented an enantioselective synthesis of rocaglamide in 18 steps and confirmed its absolute configuration.

== See also ==
- FL3 (flavagline)
- Rocaglamide
- Silvestrol
- Aglafoline
