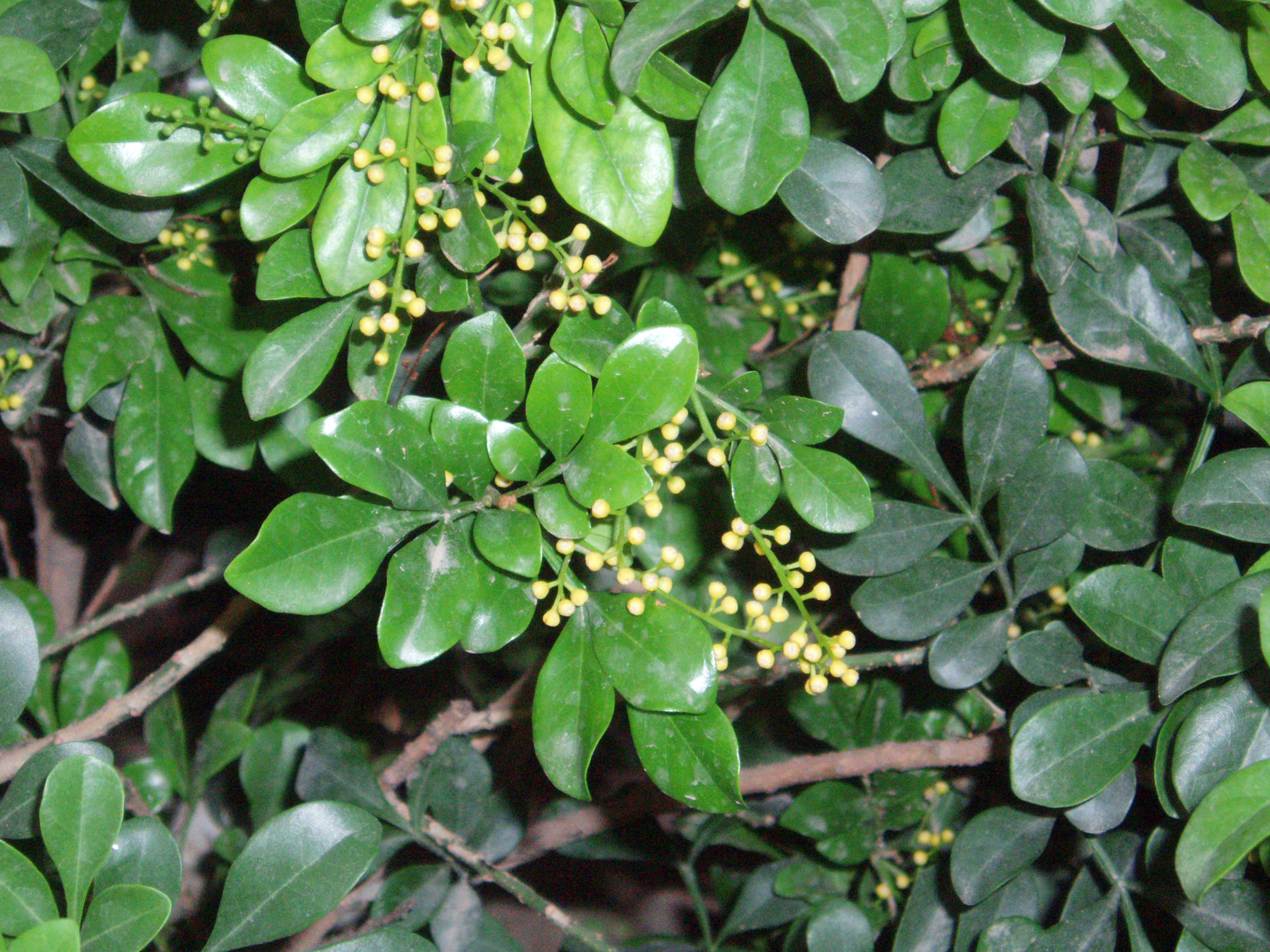

Conservation status
- Least Concern (IUCN 3.1)

Scientific classification
- Kingdom: Plantae
- Clade: Embryophytes
- Clade: Tracheophytes
- Clade: Angiosperms
- Clade: Eudicots
- Clade: Rosids
- Order: Sapindales
- Family: Meliaceae
- Genus: Aglaia
- Species: A. odorata

Binomial name
- Aglaia odorata Lour.
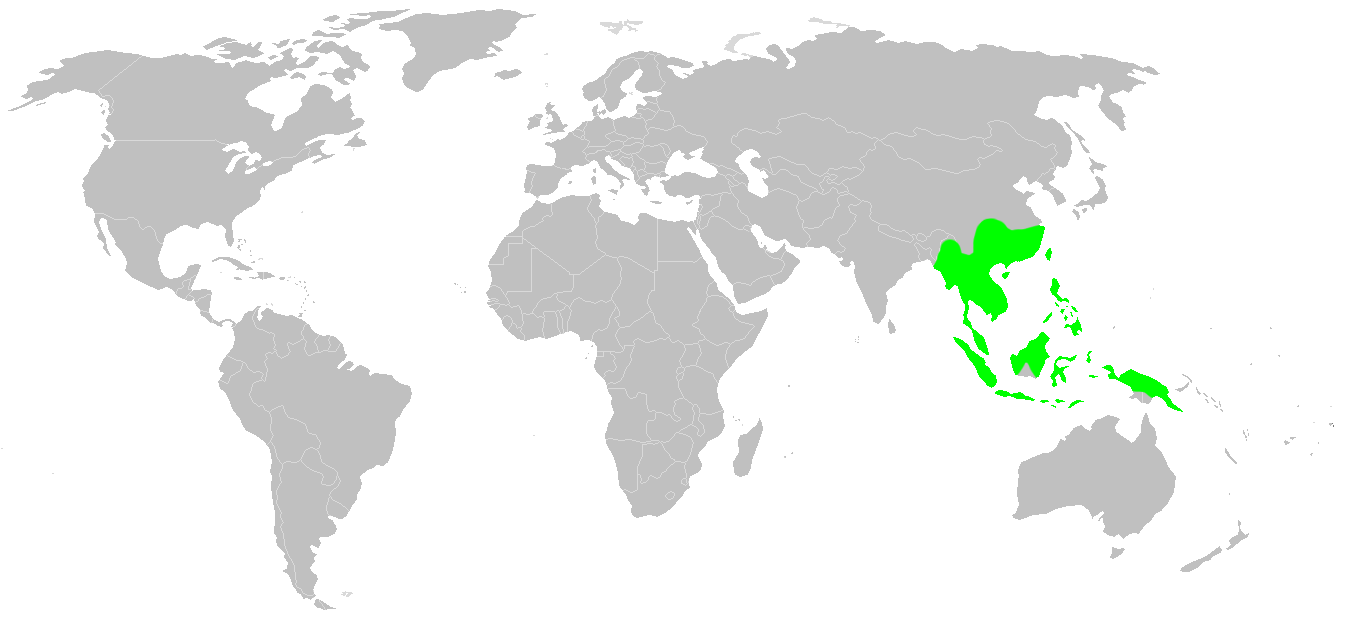

Synonyms
- Opilia odorata (Lour.) Spreng.; Aglaia chaudocensis Pierre; Aglaia duperreana Pierre; Aglaia oblanceolata Craib; Aglaia odorata var. chaudocensis (Pierre) Pellegr.; Aglaia odorata var. microphyllina C.DC.; Aglaia pentaphylla Kurz; Aglaia repoeuensis Pierre; Aglaia sinensis Pierre; Camunium chinense Roxb.; Murraya exotica Reinw. ex Miq.

= Aglaia odorata =

Species of plant

Aglaia odorata is a species of flowering plant in the family Meliaceae. It is found in Cambodia, Southeast China, Hainan, Laos, Malaysia, Thailand, and Vietnam.

It is occasionally sold as a house plant under the name "Chinese perfume plant." It can be grown outdoors in USDA zones 9 and 10.

== Description ==
Aglaia odorata is a small tree that retains its green leaves throughout the year, and can reach a height of 2 to 5 meters. It is multiple branched and its leaves are 5 to 12 centimeters long. It has small golden yellow raceme oval-shaped flowers with 6 petals. The fruit is red, about one centimeter long and egg-shaped, containing one to two seeds.

== Uses ==
=== Traditional medicinal use ===
Many parts of Aglaia odorata - roots, leaves, flowers and branches - can be used as medicine.

- The roots are boiled with water to make a drink to increase appetite. In the Philippines, the roots and leaves can be used as a tonic.
- The dried flowers are used to cure mouth ulcers and reduce fever.
- In China, the dried branches and leaves are boiled in water and used to reduce pain from rheumatic joints, injuries from falls, superficial infections and toxic swelling.
- According to research on branches by Yunnan Agricultural University and research on roots by Xishuangbanna Tropical Botanical Garden, Aglaia odorata has anti-cancer components: rocaglaol, molecular weight 434.48 g/mole and rocaglamide, molecular weight 505.55 g/mole. These components have significant cytotoxicity against blood cancer, liver cancer, lung cancer, breast cancer and colon cancer.

=== Perfume ===
The dried flowers can be used to produce perfume for clothes and mixed into cigarettes.

=== Herbicide ===
Aglaia odorata can be used as an organic herbicide to control grass and weeds in fields, such as rice fields and maize fields.
