= EIF4E =

Protein-coding gene in the species Homo sapiens

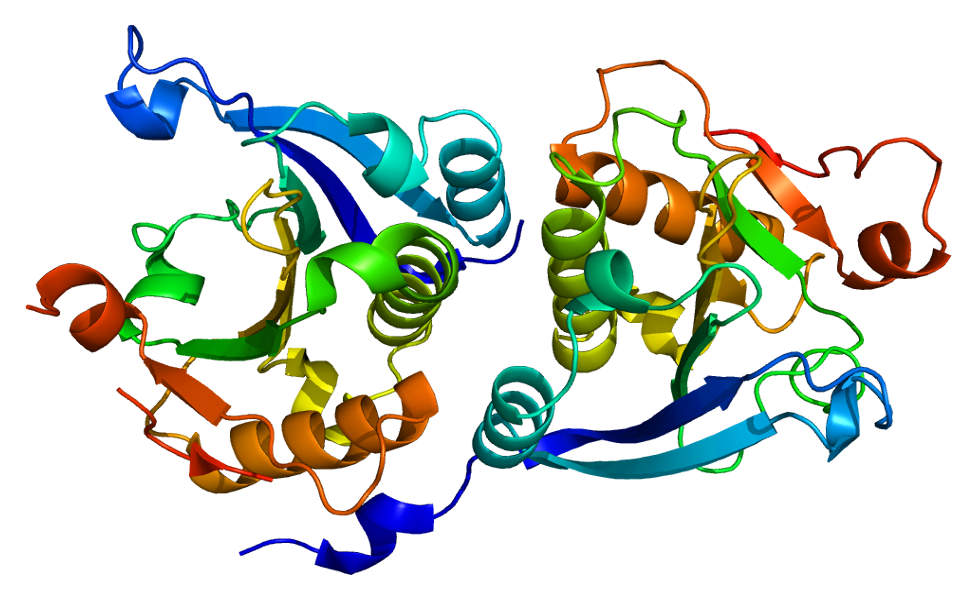

Identifiers
- Aliases: EIF4E, eukaryotic translation initiation factor 4E, AUTS19, CBP, EIF4E1, EIF4EL1, EIF4F, eIF-4E
- External IDs: OMIM: 133440; MGI: 95305; GeneCards: EIF4E
Available structures
PDB	Ortholog search: PDBe RCSB
PDB	List of PDB id codes 1IPB, 1IPC, 1WKW, 2GPQ, 2V8W, 2V8X, 2V8Y, 2W97, 3AM7, 3TF2, 3U7X, 4AZA, 4BEA, 4DT6, 4DUM, 4TPW, 4TQB, 4TQC, 4UED, 5ABI

Gene location (Human)
Chr.	Chromosome 4 (human)
Band	4q23	Start	98,879,276 bp
Band	4q23	End	98,929,133 bp

Gene location (Mouse)
Chr.	Chromosome 3 (mouse)
Band	3 G3|3 64.3 cM	Start	138,231,940 bp
Band	3 G3|3 64.3 cM	End	138,265,457 bp
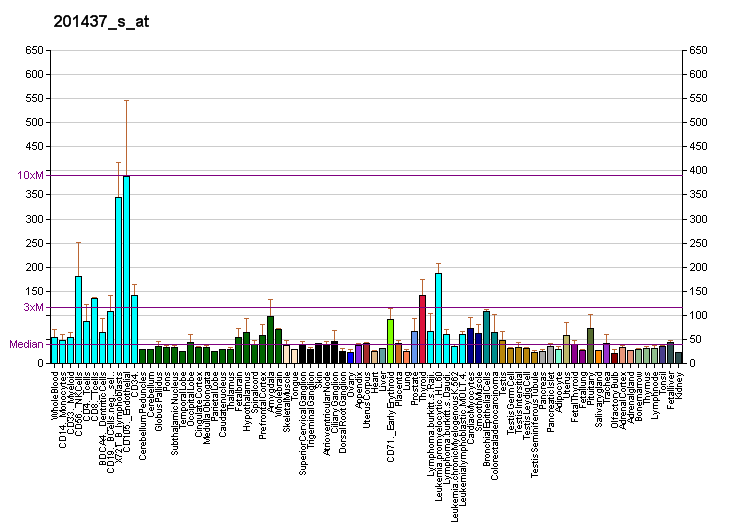

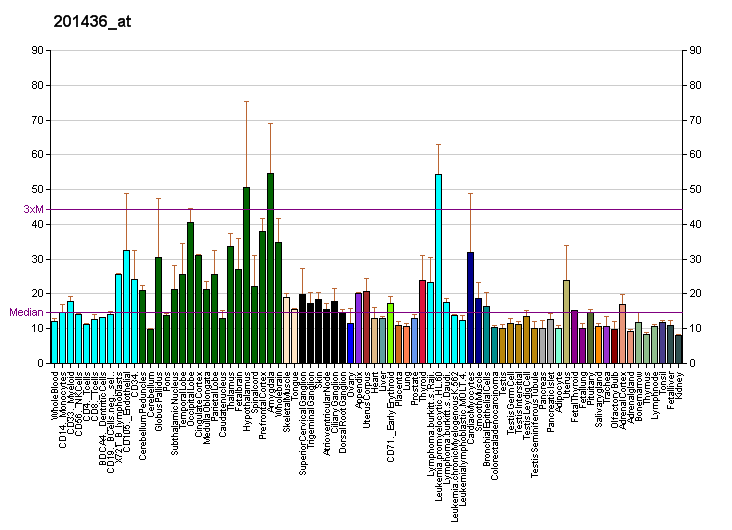

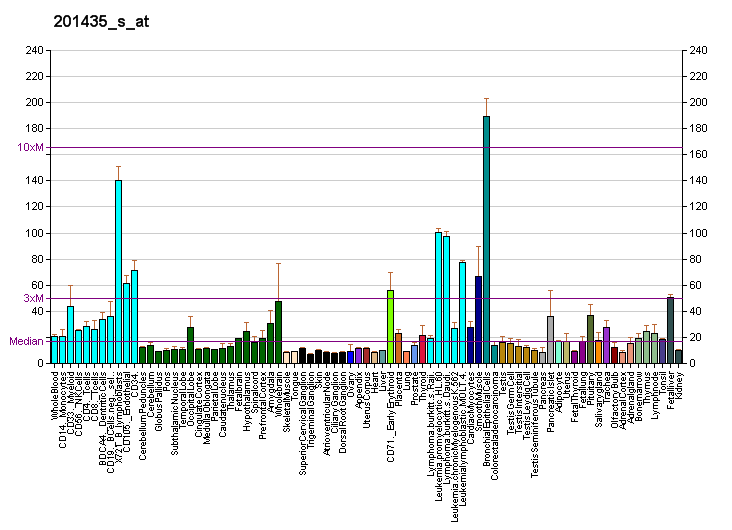
RNA expression pattern
Bgee	Human / Mouse (ortholog); Top expressed in: sperm; Achilles tendon; oocyte; ventricular zone; ganglionic eminence; secondary oocyte; right testis; rectum; left testis; epithelium of colon / Top expressed in: neural layer of retina; morula; tail of embryo; genital tubercle; ventricular zone; dentate gyrus of hippocampal formation granule cell; embryo; embryo; muscle of thigh; superior frontal gyrus; More reference expression data
BioGPS	More reference expression data
Gene ontology
Molecular function	translation initiation factor activity; eukaryotic initiation factor 4G binding; protein binding; enzyme binding; RNA cap binding; RNA 7-methylguanosine cap binding; RNA binding; translation regulator activity
Cellular component	cytoplasm; chromatoid body; RISC complex; P-body; mRNA cap binding complex; perinuclear region of cytoplasm; cytoplasmic stress granule; eukaryotic translation initiation factor 4F complex; extracellular exosome; cytosol; cytoplasmic ribonucleoprotein granule; protein-containing complex; postsynapse; glutamatergic synapse; postsynaptic cytosol
Biological process	nuclear-transcribed mRNA poly(A) tail shortening; negative regulation of translation; negative regulation of neuron differentiation; lung development; G1 phase; positive regulation of mitotic cell cycle; behavioral fear response; mRNA export from nucleus; stem cell population maintenance; translational initiation; viral process; regulation of translation; RNA export from nucleus; protein biosynthesis; negative regulation of autophagy; cellular response to dexamethasone stimulus; G1/S transition of mitotic cell cycle; regulation of translation at postsynapse, modulating synaptic transmission
Sources:Amigo / QuickGO
Orthologs
Databases	NCBI: entry; OMA: entry
Species	Human	Mouse
Entrez	1977	13684
Ensembl	ENSG00000151247	ENSMUSG00000028156
UniProt	P06730	P63073
RefSeq (mRNA)	NM_001130678; NM_001130679; NM_001968; NM_001331017	NM_007917; NM_001313980
RefSeq (protein)	NP_001124150; NP_001124151; NP_001317946; NP_001959	NP_001300909; NP_031943
Location (UCSC)	Chr 4: 98.88 – 98.93 Mb	Chr 3: 138.23 – 138.27 Mb
PubMed search
- Wikidata
View/Edit Human	View/Edit Mouse

Eukaryotic translation initiation factor 4E, also known as eIF4E, is a protein in humans encoded by the EIF4E gene. eIF4E plays a central role in translation initiation and is involved in regulating protein synthesis. Its mRNA cap-binding activity influences a range of biological processes and disease states, making it an important target for therapeutic development, particularly in disorders characterized by aberrant protein production.

== Discovery ==
eIF4E was discovered as a cytoplasmic Messenger RNA cap binding protein functioning in translation by Filipowicz et al. In 1976. Two years later, in 1978, Sonenberg et al. confirmed Filipowicz et al.'s findings by repeating the same experiments and adding a crosslinking chemical to increase the stability of the mRNA-protein complex. This was the foundation for our understanding of eukaryotic cap-dependent translation initiation. These findings have been confirmed by numerous scientists and reviewed in many articles that confirmed eIF4E binds the mRNA cap to facilitate translation initiation in eukaryotes.

== Structure ==
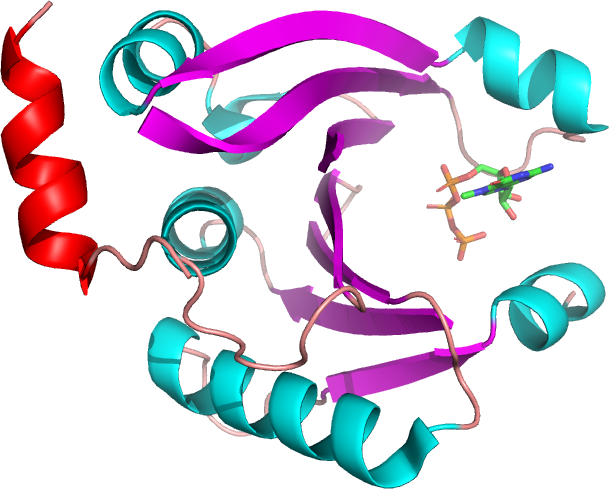
EIF4E with 7MetGTP

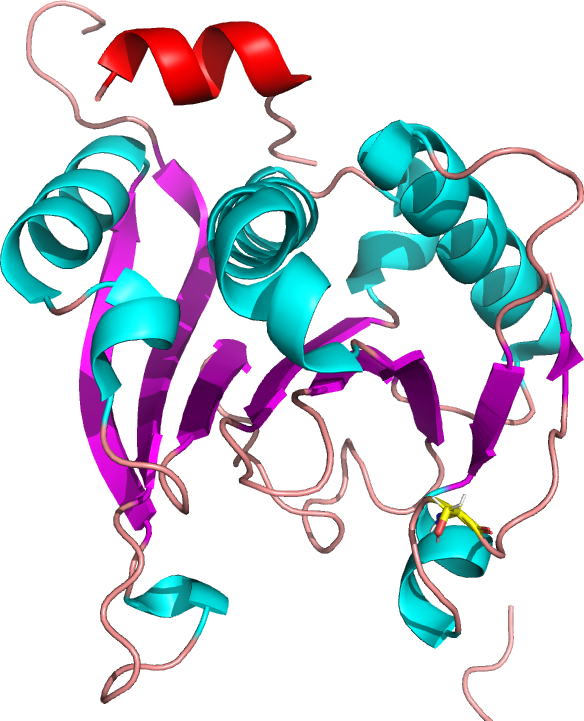
4EBP (red) bound to the alpha helices (cyan) of eIF4E.

Most eukaryotic cellular mRNAs are blocked at their 5'-ends with the 7-methyl-guanosine five-prime cap structure, m^{7}GpppX (where X is any nucleotide). eIF4E is a eukaryotic translation initiation factor that binds specifically to this cap structure. It is a 24-kD polypeptide that exists both in a free form and as part of the eIF4F pre-initiation complex. The other subunits of eIF4F are a 47-kD polypeptide, termed eIF4A, that possesses ATPase and RNA helicase activities, and a 220-kD scaffolding polypeptide, eIF4G. eIF4E is found in the nucleus of many mammalian cell types as well as in other species including yeast, drosophila and humans. eIF4E is found in nuclear bodies, some of which colocalize with PML nuclear bodies, and it also appears diffusely in the nucleoplasm.

== Function ==
=== Cap-dependent translation initiation ===
The eukaryotic translation initiation factor eIF4E plays a central role in directing ribosomes to the 5′-cap structure of mRNAs, thereby facilitating efficient protein synthesis. Cap-dependent initiation facilitated by eIF4E binding the 5' mRNA cap is considered to be the rate-limiting component of the eukaryotic translation initiation. Many cellular mRNAs depend on eIF4E for translation into protein. In this role, eIF4E functions as part of the eIF4F complex, recruiting eIF4G, eIF4A, and other factors necessary for translation initiation. However, certain viruses bypass this mechanism by cleaving eIF4G to remove the eIF4E-binding domain, thereby enabling cap-independent translation of viral RNAs. Similarly, some cellular mRNAs—such as those encoding heat shock proteins—utilize alternative translation initiation strategies, including internal ribosome entry site (IRES) elements or direct binding by other initiation factors such as eIF3d.

In contexts where eIF4E is bypassed or inhibited, other cap-binding proteins such as eIF3D, eIF3I, PARN, and the nuclear cap-binding complex (CBC) can mediate specialized translation pathways.

=== mRNA Export ===
In addition to its cytoplasmic functions, eIF4E has well-defined roles in the nucleus. It facilitates the export of specific mRNAs containing a 50-nucleotide eIF4E sensitivity element (4ESE) in their 3′ UTRs. This export mechanism depends on eIF4E's cap-binding ability, the CRM1/XPO1 export pathway, and the adaptor protein LRPPRC, which bridges eIF4E and 4ESE-containing transcripts.

=== RNA processing ===
Nuclear eIF4E also influences RNA processing events, including alternative splicing, 3′-end cleavage, and m^{7}G capping. Elevated nuclear eIF4E activity has been linked to oncogenic reprogramming in several cancers, particularly acute myeloid leukemia (AML) Through its combined roles in RNA export and translation, eIF4E acts as a global regulator of gene expression, sometimes referred to as a "cap-chaperone" protein.

== Regulation ==
=== Translational repression ===
The translation initiation factor eIF4E is tightly regulated by the fragile X mental retardation protein (FMRP), which controls the translation of specific mRNAs at synapses. FMRP interacts with CYFIP1, which directly binds eIF4E at a domain structurally analogous to those found in canonical 4E-binding proteins such as EIF4EBP1, EIF4EBP2, and EIF4EBP3. This interaction competitively inhibits eIF4G binding, thereby blocking assembly of the eukaryotic translation initiation complex and repressing translation. The FMRP–CYFIP1–eIF4E complex is further stabilized by dendritically localized, non-coding RNAs such as BC1, which enhance FMRP-CYFIP1 interactions and mediate recruitment to specific target mRNAs.

This repressive complex is responsive to neuronal stimulation. Synaptic activity promotes the dissociation of CYFIP1 from eIF4E, thereby allowing eIF4G to bind and initiate translation. This mechanism enables dynamic, activity-dependent regulation of protein synthesis at the synapse, contributing to processes such as synaptic plasticity and learning.

Since eIF4E is an initiation factor that is relatively low in abundance, eIF4E can be controlled at multiple levels. Regulation of eIF4E may be achieved at the levels of transcription, RNA stability phosphorylation, subcellular localization and partner proteins.

=== Gene expression and RNA stability ===
The mechanisms responsible for eIF4E transcriptional regulation are not entirely understood. However, several reports suggest a correlation between myc levels and eIF4E mRNA levels during the cell cycle. The basis of this relationship was further established by the characterization of two myc-binding sites (CACGTG E box repeats) in the promoter region of the eIF4E gene. This sequence motif is shared with other in vivo targets for myc and mutations in the E box repeats of eIF4E inactivated the promoter region, thereby diminishing its expression.

Recent studies shown that eIF4E levels can be regulated at transcriptional level by NFkB and C/EBP. Transduction of primary AML cells with IkB-SR resulted not only in reduction of eIF4E mRNA levels, but also re-localization of eIF4E protein. eIF4E mRNA stability are also regulated by HuR and TIAR proteins. eIF4E gene amplification has been observed in subset of head and neck and breast cancer specimens.

=== Phosphorylation ===
Stimuli such as hormones, growth factors, and mitogens that promote cell proliferation also enhance translation rates by phosphorylating eIF4E. Although eIF4E phosphorylation and translation rates are not always correlated, consistent patterns of eIF4E phosphorylation are observed throughout the cell cycle; wherein low phosphorylation is seen during G_{0} and M phase and wherein high phosphorylation is seen during G_{1} and S phase. This evidence is further supported by the crystal structure of eIF4E which suggests that phosphorylation on serine residue 209 may increase the affinity of eIF4E for capped mRNA.

eIF4E phosphorylation is also related to its ability to suppress RNA export and its oncogenic potential as first shown in cell lines.

=== Partner proteins ===
Assembly of the eIF4F complex is inhibited by proteins known as eIF4E-binding proteins (4E-BPs), which are small heat-stable proteins that block cap-dependent translation. Non-phosphorylated 4E-BPs interact strongly with eIF4E thereby preventing translation; whereas phosphorylated 4E-BPs bind weakly to eIF4E and thus do not interfere with the process of translation. Furthermore, binding of the 4E-BPs inhibits phosphorylation of Ser209 on eIF4E. Of note, 4E-BP1 is found in both the nucleus and the cytoplasm, indicating that it likely modulates nuclear eIF4Es functions of eIF4E as well. A recent study showed that 4E-BP3 regulated eIF4E dependent mRNA nucleo-cytoplasmic export. There are also many cytoplasmic regulators of eIF4E that bind to the same site as 4E-BP1.

Many other partner proteins has been found that can both stimulate or repress eIF4E activity, such as homeodomain containing proteins, including HoxA9, Hex/PRH, Hox 11, Bicoid, Emx-2 and Engrailed 2. While HoxA9 promotes mRNA export and translation activities of eIF4E, Hex/PRH inhibits nuclear functions of eIF4E. The RNA helicase DDX3 directly binds with eIF4E, modulates translation, and has potential functions in P-bodies and mRNA export.

RING domains also bind eIF4E. The promyelocytic leukemia protein PML is a potent suppressor of both the nuclear RNA export and oncogenic activities of eIF4E whereby the RING domain of PML directly binds eIF4E on its dorsal surface suppressing eIF4E's oncogenic activity; and moreover a subset of PML and eIF4E nuclear bodies co-localize. RNA-eIF4E complexes are never observed in PML bodies consistent with the observation that PML suppresses the m7G cap binding function of eIF4E. Structural studies show that a related arenavirus RING finger protein, Lassa Fever Z protein, can similarly bind eIF4E on the dorsal surface.

eIF4E nuclear entry is mediated by its direct interactions with Importin 8 where Importin 8 associates with the m7G cap-binding site of eIF4E. Indeed, reduction in Importin 8 levels reduce the oncogenic potential of eIF4E overexpressing cells and its RNA export function. Importin 8 binds to the cap-binding site of eIF4E and is competed by excess m^{7}G cap analogues as observed by NMR. eIF4E also stimulates the RNA export of Importin 8 RNA thereby producing more Importin 8 protein. There may be additional importins that play this role depending on cell type. Although an initial study suggested that the eIF4E transporter protein 4E-T (eIF4ENIF1) facilitated nuclear entry, later studies showed that this factor rather alters the localization of eIF4E to cytoplasmic processing bodies (P-bodies) and repress translation.

Potyvirus viral protein genome linked (VPg) were found to directly bind eIF4E in its cap-binding site. VPg is covalently linked to its genomic RNA and this interaction allows VPg to act as a "cap." The potyvirus VPg has no sequence or structural homology to other VPg's such as those from poliovirus. In vitro, VPg-RNA conjugates were translated with similar efficiency to m^{7}G-capped RNAs indicating that VPg binds eIF4E and engages the translation machinery; while free VPg (in the absence of conjugated RNA) successfully competes for all the cap-dependent activities of eIF4E in the cell inhibiting translation and RNA export.

=== Cellular localization ===
Several factors that regulate eIF4E functions also modulate the subcellular localization of eIF4E. For instance, overexpression of PRH/Hex leads to cytoplasmic retention of eIF4E, and thus loss of its mRNA export activity and suppression of transformation. PML overexpression leads to sequestration of eIF4E to nuclear bodies with PML and decrease of eIF4E nuclear bodies containing RNA, which correlates to repressed eIF4E dependent mRNA export and can be modulated by stress. Overexpression of LRPPRC reduces eIF4E's co-localization with PML in the nucleus and leads to increased mRNA export activity of eIF4E. As discussed above, Importin 8 brings eIF4E into the nucleus and its overexpression stimulates the RNA export and oncogenic transformation activities of eIF4E in cell lines. Transduction of primary AML cells with IkB-SR resulted not only in reduction of eIF4E mRNA levels, but also re-localization of eIF4E protein.

== Role in cancer ==
Lazaris-Karatzas et al. found that that over-expressing eIF4E causes tumorigenic transformation of fibroblasts. Since this initial observation, numerous groups have recapitulated these results in different cell lines. As a result, eIF4E activity is implicated in several cancers including cancers of the breast, lung, and prostate. In fact, transcriptional profiling of metastatic human tumors has revealed a distinct metabolic signature wherein eIF4E is known to be consistently up-regulated.

eIF4E levels are increased in many cancers including acute myeloid leukemia (AML), multiple myeloma, infant ALL, diffuse large B-cell lymphoma, breast cancer, prostate cancer, head and neck cancer and its elevation generally correlates with poor prognosis. In many of these cancers such as AML, eIF4E is enriched in nuclei and several of eIF4E's activities are found to be elevated in primary patient specimens, including capping, splicing, RNA export, and translation.

In the first clinical trials targeting eIF4E, old antiviral drug ribavirin was used as a m7G cap competitor which had substantial activity in cancer cell lines and animal models associated with dysregulated eIF4E. To date PubMed searches reveal that over 30 groups have found that ribavirin targets eIF4E activity while two did not. In the first trial to ever target eIF4E, ribavirin monotherapy was demonstrated to inhibit eIF4E activity leading to objective clinical responses including complete remissions in AML patients. Interestingly, relocalization of eIF4E from the nucleus to the cytoplasm correlated with clinical remissions indicative of the relevance of its nuclear activities to disease progression. Subsequent ribavirin trials in AML in combination with antileukemic drugs again showed objective clinical responses including remissions and molecular targeting of eIF4E. Clinical responses correlated with reduced nuclear eIF4E and clinical relapse with re-emergence of eIF4E nuclear eIF4E and its RNA export activity in these AML studies. Other studies used ribavirin in combination showed similar promising results in head and neck cancer. Ribavirin impairs all of the activities of eIF4E examined to date (splicing, capping, RNA export and translation). Thus, eIF4E has been successfully therapeutically targetable in humans; however drug resistance to ribavirin is an emergent problem to long term disease control.

eIF4E has also been targeted by antisense oligonucleotides which were very potent in mouse models of prostate cancer, but in monotherapy trials in humans did not provide clinical benefit likely due to the inefficiency of reducing eIF4E levels in humans compared to mice. Recent improvements in nanoparticle delivery may improve this strategy. There is also an allosteric inhibitor of eIF4E which binds between the cap-binding site and the dorsal surface that is used experimentally.

== Interactions ==
EIF4E has been shown to interact with:

- EIF4A1,
- EIF4EBP1,
- EIF4EBP2,
- EIF4EBP3,
- EIF4ENIF1,
- EIF4G1, and
- EIF4G2.

Other direct interactors: PML; arenavirus Z protein; Importin 8; potyvirus VPg protein, LRPPRC, RNMT, small molecule ISQ201 and others.

== See also ==
- Eukaryotic initiation factors
- Eukaryotic initiation factor 4F (eIF4F)
