= EIF4EBP2 =

Protein-coding gene in humans

Available structures
PDB	Ortholog search: PDBe RCSB
PDB	List of PDB id codes 2MX4, 3AM7

Identifiers
- Aliases: EIF4EBP2, 4EBP2, PHASII, eukaryotic translation initiation factor 4E binding protein 2
- External IDs: OMIM: 602224; MGI: 109198; HomoloGene: 3022; GeneCards: EIF4EBP2; OMA:EIF4EBP2 - orthologs

Gene location (Human)
Chr.	Chromosome 10 (human)
Band	10q22.1	Start	70,404,145 bp
Band	10q22.1	End	70,428,618 bp

Gene location (Mouse)
Chr.	Chromosome 10 (mouse)
Band	10 B4|10 32.21 cM	Start	61,264,270 bp
Band	10 B4|10 32.21 cM	End	61,288,440 bp
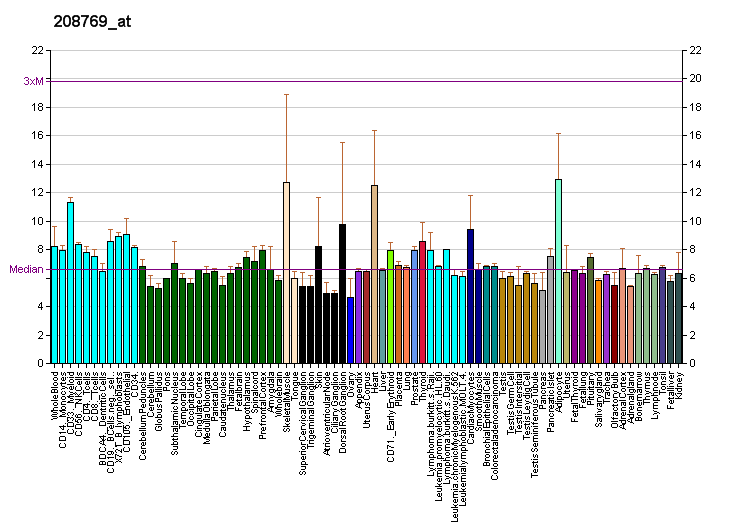

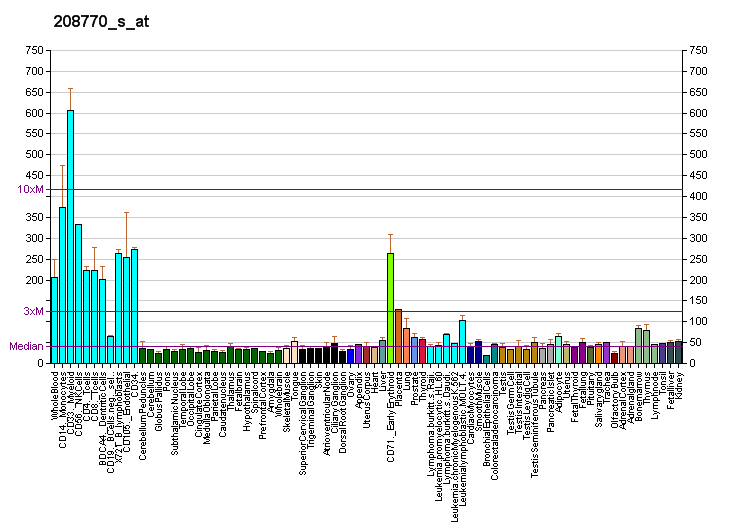
RNA expression pattern
Bgee	Human / Mouse (ortholog); Top expressed in: buccal mucosa cell; internal globus pallidus; parotid gland; epithelium of colon; amniotic fluid; jejunal mucosa; ganglionic eminence; palpebral conjunctiva; mucosa of ileum; tendon of biceps brachii / Top expressed in: extensor digitorum longus muscle; lactiferous gland; tail of embryo; genital tubercle; plantaris muscle; gallbladder; Ileal epithelium; superior surface of tongue; transitional epithelium of urinary bladder; yolk sac; More reference expression data
BioGPS	More reference expression data
Gene ontology
Molecular function	protein binding; eukaryotic initiation factor 4E binding; translation repressor activity; translation initiation factor activity
Cellular component	cytoplasm; postsynapse; intracellular anatomical structure
Biological process	social behavior; insulin receptor signaling pathway; modulation of chemical synaptic transmission; negative regulation of translation; memory; TOR signaling; protein biosynthesis; cAMP-mediated signaling; regulation of translation; negative regulation of translational initiation; regulation of synaptic plasticity; translational initiation
Sources:Amigo / QuickGO
Orthologs
Species	Human	Mouse
Entrez	1979	13688
Ensembl	ENSG00000148730	ENSMUSG00000020091
UniProt	Q13542	P70445
RefSeq (mRNA)	NM_004096	NM_010124
RefSeq (protein)	NP_004087; NP_004087.1	NP_034254
Location (UCSC)	Chr 10: 70.4 – 70.43 Mb	Chr 10: 61.26 – 61.29 Mb
PubMed search
- Wikidata
View/Edit Human	View/Edit Mouse

Eukaryotic translation initiation factor 4E-binding protein 2 is a protein that in humans is encoded by the EIF4EBP2 gene.

== Animal studies ==
EIF4EBP2 knockout mice have been used as an animal model of autism. Mice without the Eif4ebp2 gene exhibited autism-like symptoms, including poor social interaction, altered communication and repetitive behaviors. Knockout mice have high levels of Neuroligins.

== Interactions ==
EIF4EBP2 has been shown to interact with EIF4E.
