= EIF4ENIF1 =

Protein-coding gene in the species Homo sapiens

Available structures
PDB	Ortholog search: PDBe RCSB
PDB	List of PDB id codes 5ANR

Identifiers
- Aliases: EIF4ENIF1, 4E-T, Clast4, eukaryotic translation initiation factor 4E nuclear import factor 1
- External IDs: OMIM: 607445; MGI: 1921453; HomoloGene: 10522; GeneCards: EIF4ENIF1; OMA:EIF4ENIF1 - orthologs

Gene location (Human)
Chr.	Chromosome 22 (human)
Band	22q12.2	Start	31,436,977 bp
Band	22q12.2	End	31,496,108 bp

Gene location (Mouse)
Chr.	Chromosome 11 (mouse)
Band	11 A1|11 2.24 cM	Start	3,152,392 bp
Band	11 A1|11 2.24 cM	End	3,194,588 bp
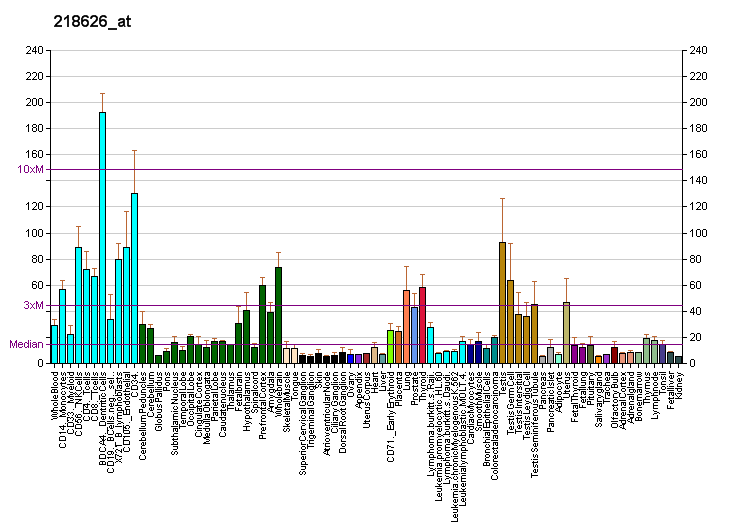
RNA expression pattern
Bgee	Human / Mouse (ortholog); Top expressed in: secondary oocyte; left testis; right testis; sural nerve; sperm; cerebellar cortex; cerebellar hemisphere; right hemisphere of cerebellum; cerebellar vermis; ventricular zone / Top expressed in: zygote; genital tubercle; tail of embryo; secondary oocyte; primary oocyte; Rostral migratory stream; interventricular septum; thymus; neural layer of retina; epiblast; More reference expression data
BioGPS	More reference expression data
Gene ontology
Molecular function	protein binding; mRNA binding; RNA binding; nuclear export signal receptor activity
Cellular component	cytoplasm; cytosol; PML body; nuclear speck; P-body; membrane; intracellular membrane-bounded organelle; nucleus
Biological process	protein transport; stem cell population maintenance; negative regulation of translation; negative regulation of neuron differentiation; transport; nuclear export
Sources:Amigo / QuickGO
Orthologs
Species	Human	Mouse
Entrez	56478	74203
Ensembl	ENSG00000184708	ENSMUSG00000020454
UniProt	Q9NRA8	Q9EST3
RefSeq (mRNA)	NM_001164501; NM_001164502; NM_019843	NM_001166547; NM_001166548; NM_001166549; NM_023743
RefSeq (protein)	NP_001157973; NP_001157974; NP_062817	NP_001160019; NP_001160020; NP_001160021; NP_076232
Location (UCSC)	Chr 22: 31.44 – 31.5 Mb	Chr 11: 3.15 – 3.19 Mb
PubMed search
- Wikidata
View/Edit Human	View/Edit Mouse

Eukaryotic translation initiation factor 4E transporter is a protein that in humans is encoded by the EIF4ENIF1 gene.

The protein encoded by this gene is a nucleocytoplasmic shuttle protein for the translation initiation factor eIF4E. This shuttle protein interacts with the importin alpha-beta complex to mediate nuclear import of eIF4E. It is predominantly cytoplasmic;its own nuclear import is regulated by a nuclear localization signal and nuclear export signals.

== Interactions ==
EIF4ENIF1 has been shown to interact with EIF4E.
