= Rocaglamide =

Names
- Preferred IUPAC name (1R,2R,3S,3aR,8bS)-1,8b-Dihydroxy-6,8-dimethoxy-3a-(4-methoxyphenyl)-N,N-dimethyl-3-phenyl-2,3,3a,8b-tetrahydro-1H-cyclopenta[b][1]benzofuran-2-carboxamide

Identifiers
CAS Number	84573-16-0
3D model (JSmol)	Interactive image
ChemSpider	293974
PubChem CID	331783
UNII	FRG4N852F7
CompTox Dashboard (EPA)	DTXSID101004852
- InChI: InChI=1S/C29H31NO7/c1-30(2)27(32)23-24(17-9-7-6-8-10-17)29(18-11-13-19(34-3)14-12-18)28(33,26(23)31)25-21(36-5)15-20(35-4)16-22(25)37-29/h6-16,23-24,26,31,33H,1-5H3/t23-,24-,26-,28+,29+/m1/s1 Key: DAPAQENNNINUPW-IDAMAFBJSA-N; InChI=1/C29H31NO7/c1-30(2)27(32)23-24(17-9-7-6-8-10-17)29(18-11-13-19(34-3)14-12-18)28(33,26(23)31)25-21(36-5)15-20(35-4)16-22(25)37-29/h6-16,23-24,26,31,33H,1-5H3/t23-,24-,26-,28+,29+/m1/s1 Key: DAPAQENNNINUPW-IDAMAFBJBD
- SMILES: CN(C)C(=O)[C@@H]1[C@H]([C@]2([C@@]([C@@H]1O)(C3=C(C=C(C=C3O2)OC)OC)O)C4=CC=C(C=C4)OC)C5=CC=CC=C5

Properties
Chemical formula	C_{29}H_{31}NO_{7}
Molar mass	505.567 g·mol^{−1}
- Except where otherwise noted, data are given for materials in their standard state (at 25 °C [77 °F], 100 kPa). Infobox references

Rocaglamide is a natural product which belongs to a class of molecules called flavaglines. This compound was isolated in 1982 by Ming-Lu King (金明儒) and colleagues based on its antileukemic activity. The name of Rocaglamide is named from two parts: Roc- and aglamide. Roc- means Republic of China (中華民國), where this product was first isolated; aglamide indicates this product is isolated from Large-leaved Aglaia (Scientific name: Aglaia rimosa). Like other flavaglines, rocaglamide displays potent insecticidal, antifungal, anti-inflammatory and anticancer activities. Rocaglamide A (RocA) inhibits eukaryotic translation initiation by binding to the translation initiation factor eIF4A and converting it into a translational repressor.

Rocaglamide was first synthesized by Barry Trost in 1990. Although other syntheses have been described since, Trost’s remains the only one to afford rocaglamide in an enantio-specific manner.

== See also ==
- FL3 (flavagline)
- Eukaryotic translation
- eIF4A
- Silvestrol
