= Aglaia foveolata =

Conservation status
- Near Threatened (IUCN 2.3)

Scientific classification
- Kingdom: Plantae
- Clade: Tracheophytes
- Clade: Angiosperms
- Clade: Eudicots
- Clade: Rosids
- Order: Sapindales
- Family: Meliaceae
- Genus: Aglaia
- Species: A. foveolata

Binomial name
- Aglaia foveolata Pannell

Species of flowering plant

Aglaia foveolata is a species of tropical tree in the family Meliaceae. This plant occurs in Brunei, Indonesia, and Malaysia. It produces edible fruit. The bark contains silvestrol which is a potent inhibitor of ebola virus and Zika Virus replication.
