= Hippuristanol =

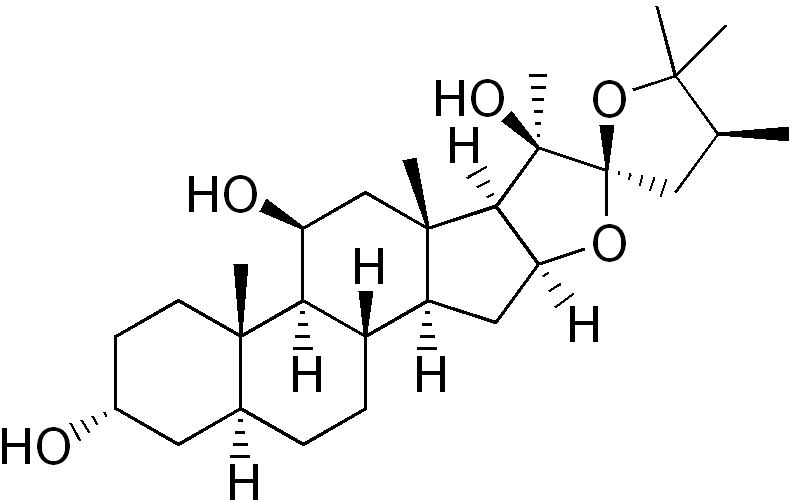

Names
- IUPAC name (24S)-24-Methyl-22β,25-epoxy-5α,22α-furostan-3α,11β,20β-triol
- Systematic IUPAC name (2R,2′R,4′S,4aS,4bS,5S,6aS,6bR,7R,9aS,10aS,10bS,12aS)-4′,4a,5′,5′,6a,7-Hexamethyloctadecahydrospiro[naphtho[2′,1′:4,5]indeno[2,1-b]furan-8,2′-oxolane]-2,5,7-triol

Identifiers
CAS Number	80442-78-0
3D model (JSmol)	Interactive image; Interactive image
ChEMBL	ChEMBL1098427
ChemSpider	21105576
PubChem CID	5205637
UNII	45PK2NS4NQ
CompTox Dashboard (EPA)	DTXSID50433627
- InChI: InChI=1S/C28H46O5/c1-15-13-28(33-24(15,2)3)27(6,31)23-21(32-28)12-19-18-8-7-16-11-17(29)9-10-25(16,4)22(18)20(30)14-26(19,23)5/h15-23,29-31H,7-14H2,1-6H3/t15-,16-,17+,18-,19-,20-,21-,22+,23-,25-,26-,27+,28+/m0/s1 Key: HPHXKNOXVBFETI-SHCCRYCOSA-N; InChI=1S/C28H46O5/c1-15-13-28(33-24(15,2)3)27(6,31)23-21(32-28)12-19-18-8-7-16-11-17(29)9-10-25(16,4)22(18)20(30)14-26(19,23)5/h15-23,29-31H,7-14H2,1-6H3/t15-,16-,17+,18-,19-,20-,21-,22+,23-,25-,26-,27+,28+/m0/s1; Key: HPHXKNOXVBFETI-SHCCRYCOSA-N
- SMILES: [H][C@@]23CC[C@@]1([H])C[C@H](O)CC[C@@](C)1[C@]([H])2[C@@H](O)C[C@@]4(C)[C@@](C[C@@]5([H])[C@@]([H])4[C@](O)(C)[C@]6(C[C@H](C)C(C)(C)O6)O5)3[H]; OC(C(=O)NNCNC(=O)c1ccccc1)(c2ccccc2)c3ccccc3

Properties
Chemical formula	C_{28}H_{46}O_{5}
Molar mass	462.66 g/mol
- Except where otherwise noted, data are given for materials in their standard state (at 25 °C [77 °F], 100 kPa). verify (what is ?) Infobox references

Hippuristanol is a small molecule found in the coral Isis hippuris which was discovered by Jerry Pelletier and others of McGill University in Montreal, Quebec, Canada. It appears to have anti-viral activity and may hold promise as a cancer therapy. Binds to and inhibits the eukaryotic translation initiation factor protein eIF4A.

== See also ==
- Eukaryotic translation
- eIF4A
