= FL3 (flavagline) =

Names
- Preferred IUPAC name (1R,3S,3aR,8bS)-3a-(4-Bromophenyl)-6,8-dimethoxy-3-phenyl-1,2,3,3a-tetrahydro-8bH-cyclopenta[b][1]benzofuran-1,8b-diol

Identifiers
CAS Number	1186012-80-5
3D model (JSmol)	Interactive image
ChEMBL	ChEMBL556074
ChemSpider	24623199
PubChem CID	44233671
UNII	FTL3D4LRE3
CompTox Dashboard (EPA)	DTXSID801030080
- InChI: InChI=1S/C25H23BrO5/c1-29-18-12-20(30-2)23-21(13-18)31-25(16-8-10-17(26)11-9-16)19(14-22(27)24(23,25)28)15-6-4-3-5-7-15/h3-13,19,22,27-28H,14H2,1-2H3/t19-,22+,24+,25-/m0/s1 Key: ACIXIVSDWSWVDW-MCWSDJLFSA-N; InChI=1/C25H23BrO5/c1-29-18-12-20(30-2)23-21(13-18)31-25(16-8-10-17(26)11-9-16)19(14-22(27)24(23,25)28)15-6-4-3-5-7-15/h3-13,19,22,27-28H,14H2,1-2H3/t19-,22+,24+,25-/m0/s1 Key: ACIXIVSDWSWVDW-MCWSDJLFBB
- SMILES: O[C@@]12[C@@]([C@H](C3=CC=CC=C3)C[C@H]2O)(C4=CC=C(Br)C=C4)OC5=CC(OC)=CC(OC)=C51

Properties
Chemical formula	C_{25}H_{23}BrO_{5}
Molar mass	483.358 g·mol^{−1}
- Except where otherwise noted, data are given for materials in their standard state (at 25 °C [77 °F], 100 kPa). Infobox references

FL3 is a synthetic flavagline that displays potent anticancer and cardioprotectant activities. This compound induces the death of cancer cells by an original mechanism that involves the apoptosis-inducing factor and caspase 12, suggesting that it may improve the efficacy of cancer chemotherapies. It was also shown that FL3 may enhance the efficacy of one of the most widely used anticancer agents, doxorubicin, and alleviate its main adverse effect, cardiac damage.
