= Atypical hyperplasia =

- Specialty: Oncology

Atypical hyperplasia is a benign (noncancerous) cellular hyperplasia in which cells show some atypia. In this condition, cells look abnormal under a microscope and are increased in number.

== By organs ==
=== Breast ===
Atypical hyperplasia is a high-risk premalignant lesion of the breast. It is believed that atypical ductal hyperplasia (ADH) is a direct precursor for low-grade mammary ductal carcinoma, whereas atypical lobular hyperplasia (ALH) serves as a risk indicator.
