= EIF4A2 =

Protein-coding gene in the species Homo sapiens

Identifiers
- Aliases: EIF4A2, BM-010, DDX2B, EIF4A, EIF4F, eIF-4A-II, eIF4A-II, eukaryotic translation initiation factor 4A2
- External IDs: OMIM: 601102; MGI: 106906; GeneCards: EIF4A2
Available structures
PDB	Ortholog search: PDBe RCSB
PDB	List of PDB id codes 3BOR
Enzyme activity
EC #	BRENDA	ExPASy	KEGG	MetaCyc
3.6.4.13	↗	↗	↗	↗

Gene location (Human)
Chr.	Chromosome 3 (human)
Band	3q27.3	Start	186,783,205 bp
Band	3q27.3	End	186,789,897 bp

Gene location (Mouse)
Chr.	Chromosome 16 (mouse)
Band	16 B1|16 13.93 cM	Start	22,926,194 bp
Band	16 B1|16 13.93 cM	End	22,932,886 bp
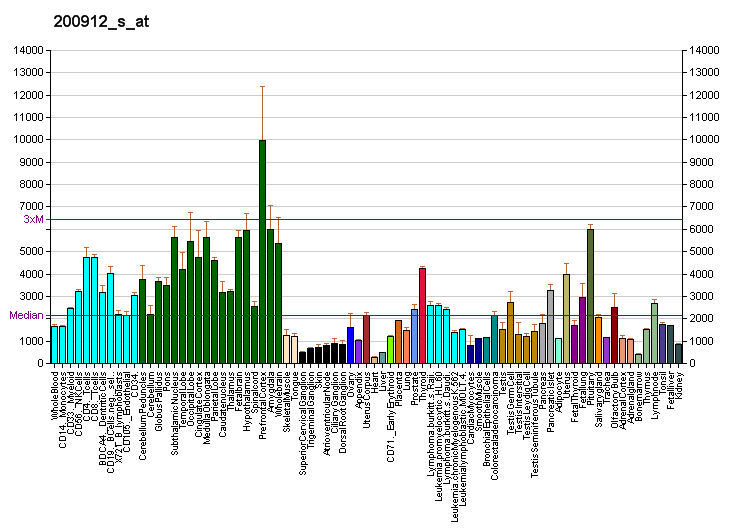
RNA expression pattern
Bgee	Human / Mouse (ortholog); Top expressed in: secondary oocyte; endothelial cell; cerebellar vermis; germinal epithelium; postcentral gyrus; superior frontal gyrus; lateral nuclear group of thalamus; Region I of hippocampus proper; Brodmann area 23; primary visual cortex / Top expressed in: dentate gyrus of hippocampal formation granule cell; diencephalon; hypothalamus; hippocampus proper; cerebellar cortex; primary visual cortex; superior frontal gyrus; olfactory bulb; uterus; ovary; More reference expression data
BioGPS	More reference expression data
Gene ontology
Molecular function	nucleotide binding; translation initiation factor activity; helicase activity; protein binding; nucleic acid binding; hydrolase activity; ATP binding; ATPase activity; RNA binding
Cellular component	cytosol; perinuclear region of cytoplasm; eukaryotic translation initiation factor 4F complex; nucleolus
Biological process	nuclear-transcribed mRNA poly(A) tail shortening; RNA secondary structure unwinding; viral process; negative regulation of RNA-directed 5'-3' RNA polymerase activity; protein biosynthesis; regulation of translational initiation; translational initiation; cellular response to leukemia inhibitory factor
Sources:Amigo / QuickGO
Orthologs
Databases	NCBI: entry; OMA: entry
Species	Human	Mouse
Entrez	1974	13682
Ensembl	ENSG00000156976	ENSMUSG00000022884
UniProt	Q14240	P10630
RefSeq (mRNA)	NM_001967	NM_001123037; NM_001123038; NM_013506; NM_001347179
RefSeq (protein)	NP_001958	NP_001116509; NP_001116510; NP_001334108; NP_038534
Location (UCSC)	Chr 3: 186.78 – 186.79 Mb	Chr 16: 22.93 – 22.93 Mb
PubMed search
- Wikidata
View/Edit Human	View/Edit Mouse

Eukaryotic initiation factor 4A-II is a protein that in humans is encoded by the EIF4A2 gene.
