= DHX30 syndrome =

Rare genetic disorder

- Specialty: Medical genetics
- Frequency: Rare

DHX30 syndrome is a rare genetic disorder affecting brain development caused by various pathogenic variants in the gene encoding the ATP-dependent RNA helicase DHX30 (commonly called DHX30). DHX30 syndrome is classified as a neurodevelopmental disorder and is characterized by variable clinical severity. Pathogenic missense variants within its conserved helicase core motifs cause global developmental delay, intellectual disability, severe speech impairment, gait abnormalities, low muscle tone, differences in brain structure, eye misalignment, autistic features, and seizures. Symptoms and their severity vary widely across individuals. Many affected individuals show symptoms in infancy. The majority of individuals with DHX30 syndrome have a non-familial (de novo) mutation in the DHX30 gene that causes a disruption in the ability of the encoded RNA helicase enzyme (also called DHX30) to perform its helicase function properly. Many individuals are not diagnosed until after they miss developmental milestones or begin to have seizures, and diagnosis requires genetic sequencing. No cure for DHX30 syndrome is currently available, and treatment focuses on alleviating symptoms.

NEDMIAL (Neurodevelopmental Disorder characterized with severe Motor Impairment and Absent Language, OMIM* 617804) is a name that has been used for this disorder, but is no longer considered appropriate because some individuals learn to speak and walk.^{1,2}

== Signs and symptoms ==
A spectrum of symptoms and severity appears in DHX30 syndrome, and individuals may have some or all of the known symptoms, and they may present as mild to severe. The main features of DHX30 syndrome are: global developmental delay, speech impairment, low muscle tone (hypotonia), intellectual disability, seizures, strabismus, joint hypermobility, feeding challenges, sleep disturbances, autistic features and behavioral differences.

== Cause ==
The majority of DHX30 syndrome cases are caused by pathogenic mutations in the gene DHX30. In most cases, the DHX30 mutation is de novo, occurring spontaneously in the egg, sperm, or sometime in the early life of the fetus, and is not inherited from either parent. Some individuals may have inherited their DHX30 mutation from one or both of their parents who may not have shown any symptoms themselves. This phenomenon, where the same mutation can have very different effects in different people, is called penetrance or expressivity and is incredibly complex and is not well understood. A parent with germline mosaicism may unknowingly carry the DHX30 mutation only in some of their egg or sperm cells. Patients have been identified with missense variants (which may cause gain-of-function) and frameshift and nonsense variants that result in haploinsufficiency or protein truncation. Pathogenic variants resulting in loss-of-function, such as nonsense and frameshift variants, result in a milder clinical outcomes.

== Genetics ==
The gene DHX30 (OMIM *616423), mapping to 3p21.31, encodes the ATP-dependent RNA helicase DHX30 (DExH-Box Helicase 30), a type of RNA helicase enzyme, which is expressed in the brain. Mutations observed in individuals with DHX30 syndrome are observed to impair DHX30's ATPase and helicase activity and tend to trigger stress granule formation. This disorder was first described in 2017 by Drs. Davor Lessel and Hans-Jürgen Kreienkamp.

== Diagnosis ==
Evaluation of DHX30 is not part of prenatal testing. Symptoms alone are not enough for a diagnosis because DHX30 syndrome looks similar to other neurodevelopmental disorders. Diagnosis can only be made through genetic sequencing and identification of a pathogenic, likely pathogenic, or variant of unknown significance in the DHX30 gene. Whole exome sequencing or whole genome sequencing is commonly used.

== Management ==
Currently, treatment focuses on supportive and symptomatic care. Current research is dedicated to understanding DHX30 syndrome and developing therapeutics.

== Advocacy ==
The Rare Remy Foundation is a patient advocacy group focusing on DHX30 research to understand DHX30 syndrome and develop targeted therapeutics. DHX30 United is a patient advocacy group dedicated to providing support to individuals with DHX30 syndrome and their families.

== Prevalence ==
With fewer than 200 cases of DHX30 reported worldwide, the exact prevalence of DHX30 syndrome is unknown, and likely to be underdiagnosed.

== Related disorders ==
Similar syndromes with aberrant stress granule assembly and clearance and global translational impairment include amyotrophic lateral sclerosis, frontotemporal dementia, spinocerebellar ataxia type 2, Fragile X syndrome, and Renpenning syndrome. Other DEAD-box and DEAH-box RNA helicase genes involved in similar developmental disorders include DDX3X, DDX6, EIF4A2, DDX23, DDX54, DDX59, EIF4A3, DHX9, DHX37, DHX16, and DHX34.
