= C6orf136 =

Protein-coding gene in the species Homo sapiens

Identifiers
- Aliases: C6orf136, chromosome 6 open reading frame 136
- External IDs: MGI: 1916912; GeneCards: C6orf136

Gene location (Human)
Chr.	Chromosome 6 (human)
Band	6p21.33	Start	30,647,039 bp
Band	6p21.33	End	30,653,210 bp

Gene location (Mouse)
Chr.	Chromosome 17 (mouse)
Band	17|17 B1	Start	36,203,569 bp
Band	17|17 B1	End	36,208,323 bp
RNA expression pattern
Bgee	Human / Mouse (ortholog); Top expressed in: mucosa of transverse colon; primary visual cortex; cerebellar cortex; cerebellar hemisphere; apex of heart; right hemisphere of cerebellum; superior frontal gyrus; Brodmann area 9; right frontal lobe; rectum / Top expressed in: Paneth cell; digastric muscle; sternocleidomastoid muscle; temporal muscle; triceps brachii muscle; right ventricle; substantia nigra; myocardium of ventricle; thoracic diaphragm; motor neuron; More reference expression data
BioGPS	n/a
Orthologs
Databases	NCBI: entry; OMA: entry
Species	Human	Mouse
Entrez	221545	69662
Ensembl	ENSG00000233641; ENSG00000233164; ENSG00000237012; ENSG00000237100; ENSG00000204564 ENSG00000224120; ENSG00000206487	ENSMUSG00000050705
UniProt	Q5SQH8	n/a
RefSeq (mRNA)	NM_001109938; NM_001161376; NM_145029	NM_001033630
RefSeq (protein)	NP_001103408; NP_001154848; NP_659466	n/a
Location (UCSC)	Chr 6: 30.65 – 30.65 Mb	Chr 17: 36.2 – 36.21 Mb
PubMed search
- Wikidata
View/Edit Human	View/Edit Mouse

C6orf136 (Chromosome 6 Open Reading Frame 136) is a protein in humans (Homo sapiens) encoded by the C6orf136 gene. The gene is conserved in mammals, mollusks, as well some porifera. While the function of the gene is currently unknown, C6orf136 has been shown to be hypermethylated in response to FOXM1 expression in Head Neck Squamous Cell Carcinoma (HNSCC) tissue cells. Additionally, elevated expression of C6orf136 has been associated with improved survival rates in patients with bladder cancer. C6orf136 has three known isoforms.

== Gene ==
=== Background ===
C6orf136, also known as DADB-129D20.1, MGC15854, LOC221545, and OTTHUMP00000214979. The gene is a poorly characterized protein coding gene in need of further research. The C6orf136 gene can be accessed on NCBI with accession number NM_001109938.3.

=== Location ===
C6orf136 is located on the short arm of chromosome 6 (6p21.33), starting at base pair (bp) 30,647,133 and ending at bp 30,653,207. This gene spans 6,074 bit/s on the plus (+) strand and contains a total of 6 exons.

=== Gene Neighborhood ===
Genes in the neighborhood of C6orf136 are the following: ATAT1, PPP1R10, DHX16, PPP1R18, MDC1, MRPS18B, TUBB, and FLOT1.

== mRNA ==
C6orf136 has a total of 3 different isoforms. Isoform 1 is the base version of C6orf136 that encodes for the 315 amino acid protein. Isoform 3 uses an alternate in-frame splice site in the 5' coding region when compared to isoform 1, resulting in isoform 3 being longer than isoform 1. Alternatively, isoform 2 lacks an alternate in-frame exon in the 5' coding region when compared to isoform 1, resulting an isoform 2 being shorter than isoform 1

== Protein ==
=== General Properties ===
The sequence for the C6orf136 isoform 1 gene per NCBI is as follows:

MYQPSRGAARRLGPCLRAYQARPQDQLYPGTLPFPPLWPHSTTTTSPSSPLFWSPLPPRLPTQRLPQVPP  70
LPLPQIQALSSAWVVLPPGKGEEGPGPELHSGCLDGLRSLFEGPPCPYPGAWIPFQVPGTAHPSPATPSG 140
DPSMEEHLSVMYERLRQELPKLFLQSHDYSLYSLDVEFINEILNIRTKGRTWYILSLTLCRFLAWNYFAH 210
LRLEVLQLTRHPENWTLQARWRLVGLPVHLLFLRFYKRDKDEHYRTYDAYSTFYLNSSGLICRHRLDKLM 280
PSHSPPTPVKKLLVGALVALGLSEPEPDLNLCSKP                                    315

The bolded region in this sequence indicates a domain of unknown function (DUF2358) found in all three isoforms of C6orf136.

The C6orf136 protein has a molecular weight of 35.8 kD and an isoelectric point of 8.99, making the protein slightly basic and physiological pH.

=== Domains ===
DUF2358 is a domain of unknown function found within the C6orf136 protein from aa149 to aa274. This domain is highly conserved in the C-terminus region and is evolutionarily conserved from plants to humans. Additionally, a proline rich domain was also predicted from aa29 to aa142 of the human C6orf136 protein.

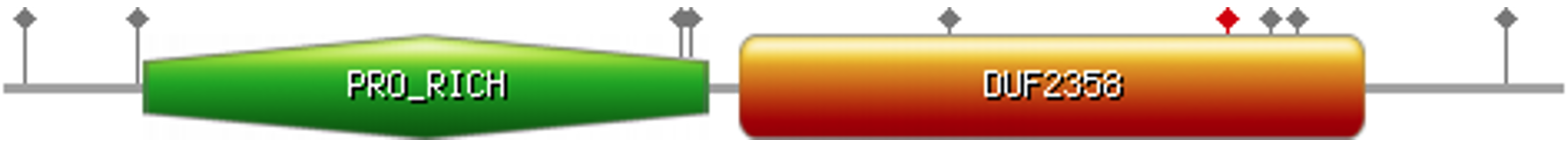
Schematic illustration of the C6orf136 protein with proline rich domain and DU2358 domain. The gray markers indicate predicted phosphorylation sites, and the red marker indicates a predicted SUMOylation site. Image made with Prosite MyDomains tool.

=== Structure ===
==== Secondary Structure ====
The conserved DUF2358 domain of C6orf136 contains an equal mix of alpha helices and beta sheets interspersed in that region. The N-terminus of the protein contained primarily alpha helices, but was poorly conserved across species.

==== Tertiary Structure ====
The tertiary structure illustrates a primarily alpha helices in the N-terminus of the protein loosely wound up, followed by a densely packed and folded region correlating to the DUF2358 domain with a mix of alpha helices and beta sheets as determined by I-TASSER.

== Regulation ==
=== Gene Regulation ===
==== Promotor ====
C6orf136 has 5 predicted promotor regions. The GXP_6051617 promotor had the largest number of transcripts and CAGE tags. It's located on the plus (+) strand, starts at position 30646644, ends at position 30647460, and is 817 bp in length. It also has 12 total coding transcripts.

Schematic diagram of the C6orf136 mRNA transcript with the ElDorado suggested promotor sites and axons labelled. Regions are not drawn to scale.

Promotor Regions of C6orf136
Promotor ID	Start Position	End Position	Length	# of Coding Transcripts
GXP_6051617 (+)	30646644	30647460	817	12
GXP_2563514 (+)	30648906	30649945	1040	1
GXP_6051618 (+)	30650054	30651093	1040	1
GXP_6051619 (+)	30650266	30651423	1158	2
GXP_3204858 (+)	30651611	30652650	1040	0

==== Transcription Factor Binding Sites ====
The following table highlights the most likely transcription factors binding to the GXP_6051617 promotor for C6orf136.

Matrix Family	Detailed Family Information
V$ZF15	C2H2 zinc finger transcription factors 15
V$NRF1	Nuclear respiratory factor 1
V$MYBL	Cellular and viral myb-like transcriptional regulators
V$CALM	Calmodulin-binding transcription factors
V$ZF07	C2H2 zinc finger transcription factors 7
V$ZF5F	ZF5 POZ domain zinc finger
V$HAND	Twist subfamily of class B bHLH transcription factors
V$KLFS	Krueppel like transcription factors
V$SP1F	GC-Box factors SP1/GC
V$EGRF	EGR/nerve growth factor induced protein C & related factors
V$PLAG	Pleomorphic adenoma gene
V$EBOX	E-box binding factors
V$RXRF	RXR heterodimer binding sites
V$RREB	Ras-responsive element binding protein
V$NKXH	NKX homeodomain factors
V$ETSF	Human and murine ETS1 factors
V$CEBP	Ccaat/Enhancer Binding Protein

==== Expression Pattern ====
C6orf136 is expressed highly in the heart, intestine, brain, and kidney tissue. According to AceView, it is well expressed at 1.3x the average gene expression.

=== Transcription Regulation ===
==== Stem Loop Prediction ====
The 3’ UTR sequence had a total of 7 step loops with a single site for potential miRNA binding. In contrast, the 5’ UTR had only 2 stem loops and contained no other notable regions.

==== miRNA Targeting ====
TargetScan indicated a single has-miRNA-585-3p miRNA binding site in the 3' UTR, shown to be associated with tumor-suppressing properties with respect to gastric cancer.

=== Protein Regulation ===
==== Subcellular Localization ====
C6orf136 is predicted to be localized primarily in the nucleus in Homo sapiens, but is predicted to be primarily expressed in the mitochondria in other species.

==== Post-Translational Modification ====
The C6orf136 gene has 8 predicted kinase-specific phosphorylation sites at positions 5, 28, 137, 139, 191, 256, 261, and 303, where 4 of the phosphorylation sites are serines, 3 sites are threonines, and 1 is a tryptophan. Additionally, the protein also has a single predicted SUMOylation site at position 247 on a lysine with a p-value of 0.063.

== Homology ==
=== Paralogs ===
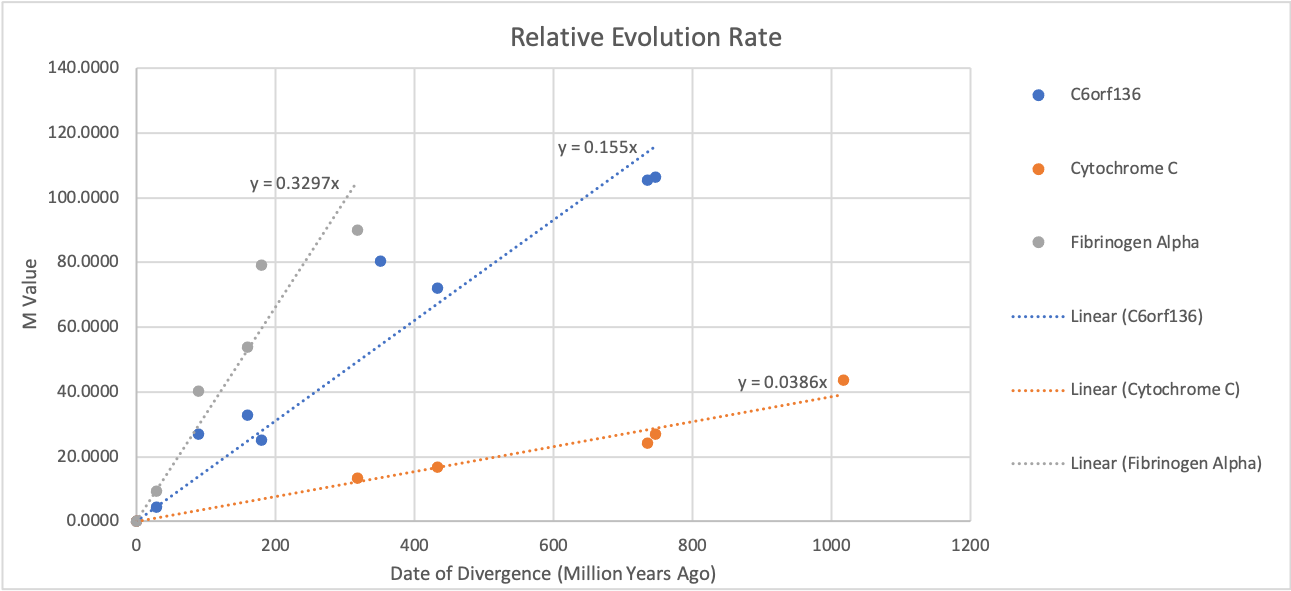
Relative mutation rate of C6orf136 (blue) compared to fibrinogen alpha (grey) and cytochrome C (orange)

No paralogs of C6orf136 have been detected in the human genome.

=== Orthologs ===
Below is a table of selected orthologs of the C6orf136 gene, including closely and distantly related orthologs. C6orf136 has evolved moderately and evenly over time with a rate faster than Cytochrome C but slower than Fibrinogen Alpha.

Selected Orthologs of C6orf136
Genus and species	Common name	Taxon Class	Date of Divergence (MYA)	Accession #	Length (AA)	% Identity with Human	% Similarity with Human
Homo sapiens	Humans	Primates	0	NP_001103408.1	315	100%	100%
Pan troglodytes	Chimpanzee	Primates	6.4	PNI76372.1	315	100%	100%
Mus musculus	Mouse	Rodentia	89	EDL23245.1	315	80%	87%
Chiroxiphia lanceolata	Lance-tailed manakin	Passerine	318	XP_032533412.1	384	60%	76%
Chelonia mydas	Sea Turtle	Testudines	318	XP_007068287.2	386	63%	74%
Gopherus evgoodei	Gopher tortoise	Testudines	318	XP_030399707.1	320	60%	72%
Melopsittacus undulatus	Parakeet	Psittaciformes	318	XP_033929477.1	288	61%	76%
Geotrypetes seraphini	Gaboon caecilian	Gymnophiona	351.7	XP_033771275.1	416	56%	70%
Danio rerio	Zebrafish	Cypriniformes	433	NP_001076315.1	423	49%	70%
Apostichopus japonicus	Sea cucumber	Synallactida	627	PIK49576.1	376	41%	59%
Strongylocentrotus purpuratus	Sea Urchin	Echinoida	627	XP_030853574.1	518	38%	56%
Branchiostoma floridae	Lancelet	Lancelet	637	XP_035683876.1	460	45%	64%
Aplysia californica	Sea hare	Aplysiidae	736	XP_005104721.2	409	25%	50%
Anopheles darlingi	Malaria mosquito	Diptera	736	ETN63757.1	303	36%	53%
Crassostrea virginica	Oyster	Ostreoida	736	XP_022320078.1	359	27%	44%
Ixodes scapularis	Ticks	Ixodida	736	XP_029848376.1	352	35%	51%
Mytilus coruscus	hard-shelled mussel	Mytilida	736	CAC5413351.1	363	33%	59%
Pomacea canaliculata	Channeled applesnail	Mollusca	736	XP_025112199.1	286	24%	39%
Wasmannia auropunctata	Electric ant	Hymenoptera	736	XP_011701036.1	387	36%	56%
Trichoplax adhaerens	Trichoplax	Tricoplaciformes	747	XP_002109420.1	415	34%	57%
Amphimedon queenslandica	Porifera	Porifera	777	XP_019852039.1	303	33%	7%

== Function ==
Proteins Interacting with C6orf136
Protein	Function	Method	Databases Present in	Total # of appearances
CSNK2B	Localized to ER and Golgi, and involved with regulating metabolic pathways, signal transduction, transcription, translation, and replication.	Y2H	iRefIndex; MINT; IMEx; mentha	13
PLK1	Regulates cell cycle, specifically G2/M transition. Loss of PLK1 expression can induce pro-apoptotic pathways. This is being studied as a target for cancer drugs, specifically colon and lung cancers that are dependent on PLK1. (Oncogene). Also possible leukemia involvement.	Y2H	iRefIndex; MINT; InnateDB-ALL; IMEx; mentha	11
RBM8A	Found predominantly in nucleus, but also in cytoplasm. Is associated with the mRNAs produced after splicing, and is thought to act as a tag to indicate where introns were present, thus coupling pre- and post-mRNA binding events.	Y2H; Affinity Chromotography; Anti-Tag Coimmunoprecipitation	iRefIndex; InnateDB-All; MatrixDB; IntAct; IMEx; metha	6
KIF21A	Kinesin-like protein (motor protein). Could be involved in microtubule dependent transport. Mutation of this gene results in fibrosis of extraocular muscles. Not much else is currently known about this gene.	Affinity Chromotography; Anti-Tag Coimmunoprecipitation	MatrixDB; IntAct; IMEx; mentha	4
FBXW7	Gene that encodes for many proteins in the F-box protein family. Mutations in this gene are associated with a variety of cancers (cholangiocarcinoma, Endometrial carcinoma, colorectal carcinoma, bladder cancer, gastric carcinoma, lung squamous cell carcinoma, etc.). Thus it's likely that this gene plays a role in the pathogenesis of human cancers.	Genetic Interference	InnateDB-	1
