= FASTKD3 =

Protein-coding gene in the species Homo sapiens

Identifiers
- Aliases: FASTKD3, FAST kinase domains 3
- External IDs: OMIM: 617530; MGI: 1916827; HomoloGene: 11457; GeneCards: FASTKD3; OMA:FASTKD3 - orthologs

Gene location (Human)
Chr.	Chromosome 5 (human)
Band	5p15.31	Start	7,859,159 bp
Band	5p15.31	End	7,869,037 bp

Gene location (Mouse)
Chr.	Chromosome 13 (mouse)
Band	13|13 B3	Start	68,730,353 bp
Band	13|13 B3	End	68,740,457 bp
RNA expression pattern
Bgee	Human / Mouse (ortholog); Top expressed in: oocyte; secondary oocyte; testicle; jejunal mucosa; olfactory zone of nasal mucosa; right uterine tube; kidney tubule; mucosa of colon; biceps brachii; hair follicle / Top expressed in: zygote; otic vesicle; secondary oocyte; primitive streak; facial motor nucleus; primary oocyte; hand; Paneth cell; epiblast; embryo; More reference expression data
BioGPS	n/a
Gene ontology
Molecular function	protein kinase activity; protein binding; RNA binding
Cellular component	mitochondrion; nucleus
Biological process	protein phosphorylation; cellular respiration; mitochondrial cytochrome c oxidase assembly; regulation of mitochondrial mRNA stability; positive regulation of mitochondrial translation
Sources:Amigo / QuickGO
Orthologs
Species	Human	Mouse
Entrez	79072	69577
Ensembl	ENSG00000124279	ENSMUSG00000021532
UniProt	Q14CZ7	Q8BSN9
RefSeq (mRNA)	NM_024091	NM_027123; NM_001330423
RefSeq (protein)	NP_076996	NP_001317352; NP_081399
Location (UCSC)	Chr 5: 7.86 – 7.87 Mb	Chr 13: 68.73 – 68.74 Mb
PubMed search
- Wikidata
View/Edit Human	View/Edit Mouse

FAST kinase domain-containing protein 3 (FASTKD3) is a protein that in humans is encoded by the FASTKD3 gene on chromosome 5. This protein is part of the Fas-activated serine/threonine kinase domain (FASTKD) containing protein family, which is known for regulating the energy balance of mitochondria under stress.

== Structure ==
FASTKD3 shares structural characteristics of the FASTKD family, including an N-terminal mitochondrial targeting domain and three C-terminal domains: two FAST kinase-like domains (FAST_1 and FAST_2) and a RNA-binding domain (RAP). The mitochondrial targeting domain directs FASTKD3 to be imported into the mitochondria. Though the functions of the C-terminal domains are unknown, RAP possibly binds RNA during trans-splicing.

== Function ==
As a member of the FASTKD family, FASTKD3 localizes to the mitochondria to modulate their energy balance, especially under conditions of stress. Though ubiquitously expressed in all tissues, FASTKD3 appears more abundantly in skeletal muscle, heart muscle, and other tissues enriched in mitochondria. FASTKD3 has been proposed to regulate energy production by serving as a scaffold protein that brings together RNA processing/translation and respiratory components.

== Clinical Significance ==
Currently, FASTKD3 has not been linked to any disease. (Dated: September 17, 2015)

== Interactions ==
FASTKD3 has been shown to interact with:

- FASTKD2;
- Fatty acid beta oxidation pathway proteins (ACADVL, ECHS1, HADHA, HADHB, ACAA2);
- Amino acid catabolic pathways proteins (MCCC1, MCCC2, GLUD1, HIBADH, CPS1);
- Amino acid biosynthesis proteins (PYCR1, PYCR2, ALDH18A1, SHMT2, GLS);
- TCA cycle proteins (IDH3A, IDH2, SUCLG2, DLST);
- Respiratory chain proteins (NDUFS1, SDHA, ATP5F1A, ETFA, ETFB);
- Mitochondrial RNA processing proteins (LRPPRC, DHX30, PNPT1); and
- Mitochondrial translation proteins (TUFM, GFM1, IARS2, MRPS22, TARS2, MRPS2, PTCD1, MTO1, MRPS31).
