= DDX47 =

Protein-coding gene in humans

Identifiers
- Aliases: DDX47, E4-DBP, HQ0256, MSTP162, RRP3, DEAD-box helicase 47
- External IDs: OMIM: 615428; MGI: 1915005; GeneCards: DDX47
Available structures
PDB	Ortholog search: PDBe RCSB
PDB	List of PDB id codes 3BER
Enzyme activity
EC #	BRENDA	ExPASy	KEGG	MetaCyc
3.6.4.13	↗	↗	↗	↗

Gene location (Human)
Chr.	Chromosome 12 (human)
Band	12p13.1	Start	12,813,316 bp
Band	12p13.1	End	12,829,981 bp

Gene location (Mouse)
Chr.	Chromosome 6 (mouse)
Band	6|6 G1	Start	134,988,575 bp
Band	6|6 G1	End	135,000,739 bp
RNA expression pattern
Bgee	Human / Mouse (ortholog); Top expressed in: islet of Langerhans; ventricular zone; smooth muscle tissue; skin of abdomen; body of uterus; body of pancreas; skin of leg; left lobe of thyroid gland; left ovary; myometrium / Top expressed in: tail of embryo; Paneth cell; Ileal epithelium; primitive streak; genital tubercle; blastocyst; morula; ventricular zone; renal corpuscle; medullary collecting duct; More reference expression data
BioGPS	n/a
Gene ontology
Molecular function	nucleotide binding; protein binding; hydrolase activity; ATP binding; helicase activity; nucleic acid binding; RNA binding
Cellular component	nucleolus; membrane; nucleus; nucleoplasm; cytoplasm
Biological process	mRNA processing; extrinsic apoptotic signaling pathway via death domain receptors; RNA secondary structure unwinding; RNA splicing; apoptotic process; rRNA processing
Sources:Amigo / QuickGO
Orthologs
Databases	NCBI: entry; OMA: entry
Species	Human	Mouse
Entrez	51202	67755
Ensembl	ENSG00000213782	ENSMUSG00000030204
UniProt	Q9H0S4	Q9CWX9
RefSeq (mRNA)	NM_201224; NM_016355	NM_026360
RefSeq (protein)	NP_057439; NP_957518	NP_080636
Location (UCSC)	Chr 12: 12.81 – 12.83 Mb	Chr 6: 134.99 – 135 Mb
PubMed search
- Wikidata
View/Edit Human	View/Edit Mouse

Probable ATP-dependent RNA helicase DDX47 is an enzyme that in humans is encoded by the DDX47 gene.

This gene encodes a member of the DEAD box protein family. DEAD box proteins, characterized by the conserved motif Asp-Glu-Ala-Asp (DEAD), are putative RNA helicases. They are implicated in a number of cellular processes involving alteration of RNA secondary structure, such as translation initiation, nuclear and mitochondrial splicing, and ribosome and spliceosome assembly. Based on their distribution patterns, some members of this family are believed to be involved in embryogenesis, spermatogenesis, and cellular growth and division. The protein encoded by this gene can shuttle between the nucleus and the cytoplasm, and has an RNA-independent ATPase activity. Two alternatively spliced transcript variants encoding distinct isoforms have been found for this gene.
