= RNA helicase =

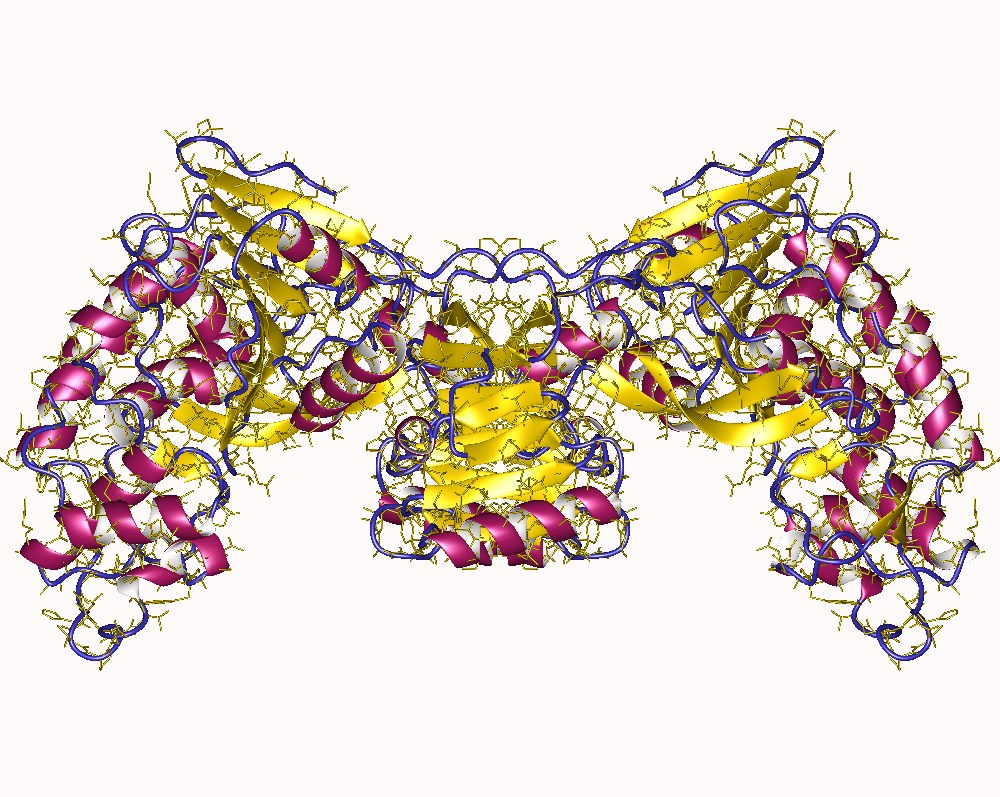
- RNA helicase dimer, Hepatitis C virus

Identifiers
- EC no.: 3.6.4.13

Databases
- BRENDA: enzyme data
- ExPASy: NiceZyme view
- KEGG: enzyme entry
- MetaCyc: metabolic pathway
- Rhea: reactions
- PDB structures: RCSB PDB PDBe PDBsum
Search
- PMC: articles
- PubMed: articles
- NCBI: proteins

An RNA helicase is an enzyme that unwinds RNA. The unwinding is powered by the helicase's hydrolysis of ATP. RNA helicases are involved holistically in the metabolism of RNA, which is found in all facets of life on Earth. (Note: systematic name: ATP phosphohydrolase (RNA helix unwinding), (EC 3.6.4.13, CSFV NS3 helicase, DBP2, DbpA, DDX17, DDX25, DDX3, DDX3X, DDX3Y, DDX4, DDX5, DDX6, DDX23, DDX54, DDX59, DEAD-box protein DED1, DEAD-box RNA helicase, DEAD-box protein 2, DEAH-box RNA helicase, DED1, Dex(H/D) RNA helicase, DHX9, DHX16 ,DHX30, DHX34, DHX37, EhDEAD1, EhDEAD1 RNA helicase, eIF4A helicase, EIF4A2, EIF4A3, KOKV helicase, Mtr4p, nonstructural protein 3 helicase, NPH-II, RHA, RNA helicase A, RNA helicase DDX3, RNA helicase Hera, RNA-dependent ATPase, TGBp1 NTPase/helicase domain, VRH1, GRTH/DDX25).)

== Structure and superfamilies ==
RNA helicases are split into two main categories based on their ability to form oligomeric structures. Of the six superfamilies (SFs) that exist, SFs 1 and 2 do not form rings, whereas SFs 3, 4, 5, and 6 do.

The first two superfamilies, usually found in eukaryotes, are composed of a structurally conserved core that is usually surrounded by large N- and C- terminal domains that function as RNA and DNA binding domains, protein binding domains, and other molecular specific functions. The function of these domains is extremely significant in cellular interaction by increasing specificity of recruitment of proteins by using structurally specific complexes and sequences within families. These two helicases are also made up of at least 12 structural motifs are positioned in specific sequences that vary between families but are usually highly conserved within the same family.

SFs 3 through 6 form hexameric rings and are usually found in bacteria and viruses. Proteins of the superfamilies 3 and 4 are most similar to each other. However, SF4 contains a packaging motor named P4 that plays a role of packaging the RNA into a phage by first unwinding the structure and translocating the information into capsids. SF5 contains a Bacterial Rho factor that works to regulate transcription termination as well as removing RNA polymerase. SF6 contains a structure that works similarly to the Bacterial Rho factor but is different structurally.

== Mechanisms ==
There are two known mechanisms for RNA helicase unwinding: canonical duplex unwinding and unwinding by local strand separation.

During canonical duplex unwinding, the helicase first binds to the single stranded region, then uses ATP hydrolysis as a power stroke in order to translocate the helicase across the strand. As the helicase slides down one strand, it is dissociating the two strands and removing the complementary. Finally, the helicase is removed.

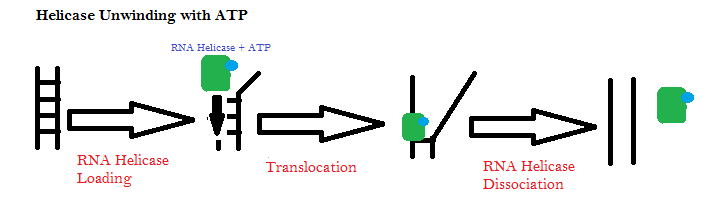
the mechanism in which RNA Helicase unwinds. The Helicase is represented by the green box. The blue circle represents the ATP, which drives the RNA Helicase down the strand in order to separate the two from one another. Once the two strands are completely separated, the RNA Helicase dissociates.

The second unwinding mechanism is dependent on specific sequences called DEAD box helicases. As opposed to the canonical unwinding, local strand separation loads the helicase directly on the duplex region. DEAD box proteins, which are part of SF2, catalyze ATP-driven structural changes in RNA by unwinding substrates with the help of promoter sequences and accessory domains. Although both mechanisms require ATP, local strand separation does not need to hydrolyze ATP as long as the ATP binds to the duplex strands.

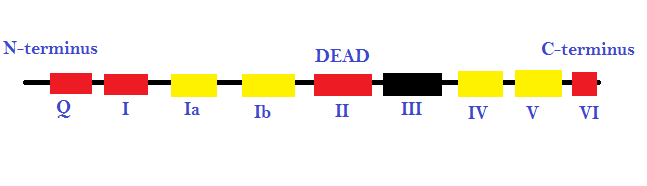
the different promoter sequences and accessory domains that aid in RNA unwinding. The regions in red are ATP binding domains and the regions in yellow are RNA interaction domains. Specific sequences termed DEAD box proteins are also present that help catalyze reactions in which ATP does not need to be directly hydrolyzed, as long as it binds to the domains on the strand.

== Related diseases ==
Most viruses are RNA viruses, usually containing an RNA helicase of their own (except in the case of retroviruses). These viruses depend on RNA helicase in order to replicate in the host, and helicase aids in transcription, translation, splicing, assembly, etc. in infectious diseases such as Hepatitis C. RNA processing has also played in a role in neurological disorders such as Amyotrophic lateral sclerosis (ALS, Lou Gehrig’s disease) and Alzheimer disease (AD). Alternative splicing that is carried out by the RNA helicase plays a central role in the nervous system, so defects in spliced mRNA may lead to serious degenerative effects in the spinal cord and brain. Especially at a young age, it is crucial for the transcription of mRNA to be responsive to binding factors for RNA helicase because these signals are essential for proper growth. It has also been shown that there are several RNA helicases that have altered gene expression in cancer cells. A specific helicase DDX1 is involved in mRNA processing and translation that affects cellular proliferation and tumor development. During the progression of cancer, tumor cells are growing at an increased rate by maintaining higher mRNA processing functions because of defects in DDX1. It is known that RNA helicases are extremely important for RNA metabolism, so problems in their function can be detrimental to human life. Antiviral and anti-cancer therapies have been targeting defects in RNA helicase and the results have been promising thus far.
