= DDX31 =

Protein-coding gene in the species Homo sapiens

Identifiers
- Aliases: DDX31, PPP1R25, DEAD-box helicase 31
- External IDs: OMIM: 616533; MGI: 2682639; GeneCards: DDX31
Enzyme activity
EC #	BRENDA	ExPASy	KEGG	MetaCyc
3.6.4.13	↗	↗	↗	↗

Gene location (Human)
Chr.	Chromosome 9 (human)
Band	9q34.13	Start	132,592,997 bp
Band	9q34.13	End	132,670,401 bp

Gene location (Mouse)
Chr.	Chromosome 2 (mouse)
Band	2|2 A3	Start	28,730,418 bp
Band	2|2 A3	End	28,795,583 bp
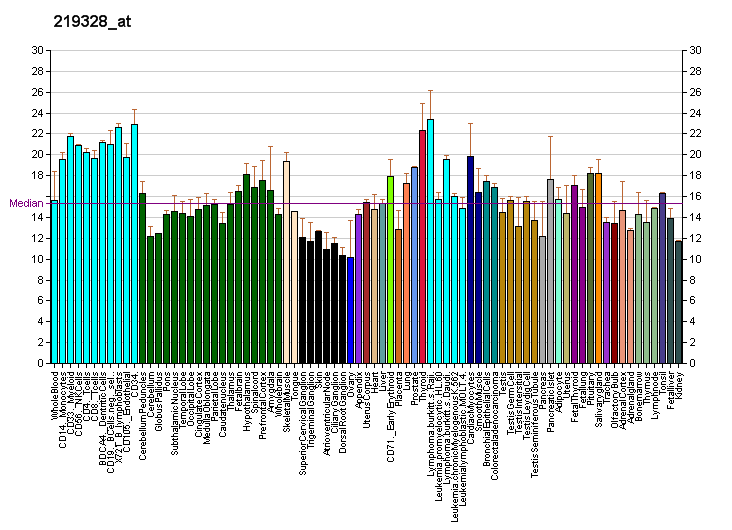
RNA expression pattern
Bgee	Human / Mouse (ortholog); Top expressed in: gonad; right lobe of thyroid gland; left lobe of thyroid gland; cerebellar hemisphere; right hemisphere of cerebellum; skin of leg; islet of Langerhans; skin of abdomen; tibial nerve; testicle / Top expressed in: lumbar spinal ganglion; Paneth cell; condyle; otic vesicle; primitive streak; fossa; medullary collecting duct; aortic valve; tail of embryo; epiblast; More reference expression data
BioGPS	More reference expression data
Gene ontology
Molecular function	nucleotide binding; protein binding; hydrolase activity; ATP binding; helicase activity; nucleic acid binding; RNA binding
Cellular component	Golgi apparatus; intracellular membrane-bounded organelle; nucleus; nucleolus; cytoplasm
Biological process	ribosome biogenesis; RNA secondary structure unwinding
Sources:Amigo / QuickGO
Orthologs
Databases	NCBI: entry; OMA: entry
Species	Human	Mouse
Entrez	64794	227674
Ensembl	ENSG00000125485	ENSMUSG00000026806
UniProt	Q9H8H2	Q6NZQ2
RefSeq (mRNA)	NM_022779; NM_138620; NM_001322340; NM_001322341; NM_001322342 NM_001322343; NM_001322344	NM_001033294
RefSeq (protein)	NP_001309269; NP_001309270; NP_001309271; NP_001309272; NP_001309273 NP_073616; NP_619526	NP_001028466
Location (UCSC)	Chr 9: 132.59 – 132.67 Mb	Chr 2: 28.73 – 28.8 Mb
PubMed search
- Wikidata
View/Edit Human	View/Edit Mouse

DEAD (Asp-Glu-Ala-Asp) box polypeptide 31, also known as DDX31, is a human gene.

DEAD box proteins, characterized by the conserved motif Asp-Glu-Ala-Asp (DEAD), are putative RNA helicases. They are implicated in a number of cellular processes involving alteration of RNA secondary structure such as translation initiation, nuclear and mitochondrial splicing, and ribosome and spliceosome assembly. Based on their distribution patterns, some members of this DEAD box protein family are believed to be involved in embryogenesis, spermatogenesis, and cellular growth and division. This gene encodes a member of this family. The function of this member has not been determined. Alternative splicing of this gene generates 2 transcript variants.
