= FASTKD5 =

Protein-coding gene in the species Homo sapiens

Identifiers
- Aliases: FASTKD5, dJ1187M17.5, FAST kinase domains 5
- External IDs: OMIM: 614272; MGI: 2139469; GeneCards: FASTKD5

Gene location (Human)
Chr.	Chromosome 20 (human)
Band	20p13	Start	3,146,519 bp
Band	20p13	End	3,159,865 bp

Gene location (Mouse)
Chr.	Chromosome 2 (mouse)
Band	2|2 F1	Start	130,455,760 bp
Band	2|2 F1	End	130,471,947 bp
RNA expression pattern
Bgee	Human / Mouse (ortholog); Top expressed in: gastrocnemius muscle; muscle of thigh; deltoid muscle; islet of Langerhans; left ventricle; white blood cell; monocyte; right adrenal cortex; biceps brachii; left adrenal gland / Top expressed in: otic placode; saccule; otic vesicle; primary oocyte; condyle; Paneth cell; abdominal wall; fetal liver hematopoietic progenitor cell; medial ganglionic eminence; substantia nigra; More reference expression data
BioGPS	n/a
Gene ontology
Molecular function	protein kinase activity; rRNA binding; protein binding; RNA binding
Cellular component	ribonucleoprotein granule; mitochondrial nucleoid; mitochondrion
Biological process	cellular respiration; protein phosphorylation; mRNA processing; mitochondrial RNA processing
Sources:Amigo / QuickGO
Orthologs
Databases	NCBI: entry; OMA: entry
Species	Human	Mouse
Entrez	60493	380601
Ensembl	ENSG00000215251	ENSMUSG00000079043
UniProt	Q7L8L6	Q7TMV3
RefSeq (mRNA)	NM_021826	NM_001146084; NM_198176; NM_001377124; NM_001377125
RefSeq (protein)	NP_068598	NP_001139556; NP_937819; NP_001364053; NP_001364054
Location (UCSC)	Chr 20: 3.15 – 3.16 Mb	Chr 2: 130.46 – 130.47 Mb
PubMed search
- Wikidata
View/Edit Human	View/Edit Mouse

FAST kinase domain-containing protein 5 (FASTKD5) is a protein that in humans is encoded by the FASTKD5 gene on chromosome 20. This protein is part of the FASTKD family, which is known for regulating the energy balance of mitochondria under stress. FASTKD5 is also required for RNA granules to process precursor mRNAs not flanked by tRNAs.

== Structure ==
FASTKD5 shares structural characteristics of the FASTKD family, including an amino terminal mitochondrial targeting domain and three C-terminal domains: two FAST kinase-like domains (FAST_1 and FAST_2) and a RNA-binding domain (RAP). The mitochondrial targeting domain directs FASTKD5 to be imported into the mitochondria. Though the functions of the C-terminal domains are unknown, RAP possibly binds RNA during trans-splicing. This protein forms a 103 kDa protein complex with unidentified proteins.

== Function ==
As a member of the FASTKD family, FASTKD5 localizes to the mitochondria to modulate their energy balance, especially under conditions of stress. Though ubiquitously expressed in all tissues, FASTKD5 appears more abundantly in skeletal muscle, heart muscle, and other tissues enriched in mitochondria. FASTKD5 also localizes to RNA granules, membraneless bodies containing mRNAs and associated RNA-binding proteins, where it facilitates posttranscriptional RNA processing. This protein is required for the maturation of precursor mRNAs that are not flanked by tRNAs, and thus cannot be processed by the canonical mRNA maturation pathway.

== Clinical significance ==
Though the link to FASTKD5 remains uncharacterized, the accumulation of abnormal RNA granules can lead to some neurodegenerative diseases.

== Interactions ==
FASTKD5 has been shown to interact with:

- FASTKD2,
- DHX30, and
- GRSF1.
