= DDX56 =

Protein-coding gene in the species Homo sapiens

Identifiers
- Aliases: DDX56, DDX21, DDX26, NOH61, DEAD-box helicase 56
- External IDs: OMIM: 608023; MGI: 1277172; GeneCards: DDX56
Enzyme activity
| EC # | BRENDA | ExPASy | KEGG | MetaCyc |
|---|---|---|---|---|
| 3.6.4.13 | ↗ | ↗ | ↗ | ↗ |

Gene location (Human)
| Chr. | Chromosome 7 (human) |
| Band | 7p13 | Start | 44,565,804 bp |
| Band | 7p13 | End | 44,575,051 bp |

Gene location (Mouse)
| Chr. | Chromosome 11 (mouse) |
| Band | 11 A1|11 3.94 cM | Start | 6,208,919 bp |
| Band | 11 A1|11 3.94 cM | End | 6,217,772 bp |
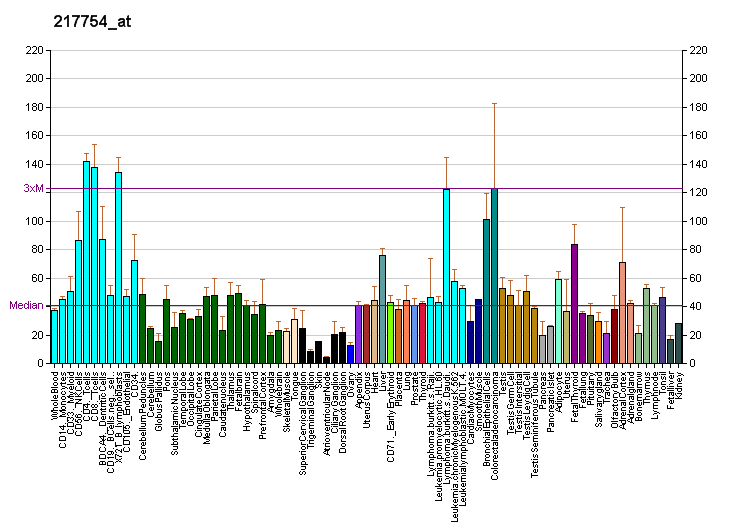
RNA expression pattern
| Bgee | Human / Mouse (ortholog); Top expressed in: cerebellar hemisphere; right hemisphere of cerebellum; right lobe of thyroid gland; left lobe of thyroid gland; mucosa of transverse colon; anterior pituitary; right ovary; left ovary; granulocyte; right lobe of liver / Top expressed in: otic placode; otic vesicle; saccule; blastocyst; morula; embryo; embryo; epiblast; spermatocyte; yolk sac; More reference expression data |
| BioGPS | More reference expression data |
Gene ontology
| Molecular function | nucleotide binding; hydrolase activity; ATP binding; helicase activity; nucleic acid binding; RNA binding |
| Cellular component | membrane; nucleus; nucleolus; cytoplasm |
| Biological process | rRNA processing; RNA secondary structure unwinding; ribosome biogenesis; positive regulation of neuron projection development |
Sources:Amigo / QuickGO
Orthologs
| Databases | NCBI: entry; OMA: entry |
| Species | Human | Mouse |
| Entrez | 54606 | 52513 |
| Ensembl | ENSG00000136271 | ENSMUSG00000004393 |
| UniProt | Q9NY93 | Q9D0R4 |
| RefSeq (mRNA) | NM_019082; NM_001257189 | NM_026538 |
| RefSeq (protein) | NP_001244118; NP_061955 | NP_080814 |
| Location (UCSC) | Chr 7: 44.57 – 44.58 Mb | Chr 11: 6.21 – 6.22 Mb |
| PubMed search |
- Wikidata
| View/Edit Human | View/Edit Mouse |

Probable ATP-dependent RNA helicase DDX56 is an enzyme that in humans is encoded by the DDX56 gene.

This gene encodes a member of the DEAD box protein family. DEAD box proteins, characterized by the conserved motif Asp-Glu-Ala-Asp (DEAD), are putative RNA helicases. They are implicated in a number of cellular processes involving alteration of RNA secondary structure such as translation initiation, nuclear and mitochondrial splicing, and ribosome and spliceosome assembly. Based on their distribution patterns, some members of this family are believed to be involved in embryogenesis, spermatogenesis, and cellular growth and division. The protein encoded by this gene shows ATPase activity in the presence of polynucleotides and associates with nucleoplasmic 65S preribosomal particles. This gene may be involved in ribosome synthesis, most likely during assembly of the large 60S ribosomal subunit.
