= DHX34 =

Protein-coding gene in the species Homo sapiens

Identifiers
- Aliases: DHX34, DDX34, HRH1, DEAH-box helicase 34, DExH-box helicase 34
- External IDs: OMIM: 615475; MGI: 1918973; GeneCards: DHX34
Enzyme activity
EC #	BRENDA	ExPASy	KEGG	MetaCyc
3.6.4.13	↗	↗	↗	↗

Gene location (Human)
Chr.	Chromosome 19 (human)
Band	19q13.32	Start	47,349,315 bp
Band	19q13.32	End	47,382,704 bp

Gene location (Mouse)
Chr.	Chromosome 7 (mouse)
Band	7|7 A2	Start	15,931,072 bp
Band	7|7 A2	End	15,955,962 bp
RNA expression pattern
Bgee	Human / Mouse (ortholog); Top expressed in: right testis; blood; left testis; granulocyte; spleen; right uterine tube; right lobe of liver; anterior pituitary; canal of the cervix; right hemisphere of cerebellum / Top expressed in: granulocyte; gastrula; spermatocyte; seminiferous tubule; yolk sac; esophagus; submandibular gland; ventricular zone; islet of Langerhans; spermatid; More reference expression data
BioGPS	n/a
Gene ontology
Molecular function	nucleotide binding; hydrolase activity; ATP binding; helicase activity; RNA binding; 3'-5' RNA helicase activity
Cellular component	membrane; cytoplasm
Biological process	nuclear-transcribed mRNA catabolic process; RNA processing; negative regulation of nuclear-transcribed mRNA catabolic process, nonsense-mediated decay; nuclear-transcribed mRNA catabolic process, nonsense-mediated decay
Sources:Amigo / QuickGO
Orthologs
Databases	NCBI: entry; OMA: entry
Species	Human	Mouse
Entrez	9704	71723
Ensembl	ENSG00000134815	ENSMUSG00000006019
UniProt	Q14147	Q9DBV3
RefSeq (mRNA)	NM_014681; NM_194428	NM_001285931; NM_001285932; NM_027883
RefSeq (protein)	NP_055496	NP_001272860; NP_001272861; NP_082159
Location (UCSC)	Chr 19: 47.35 – 47.38 Mb	Chr 7: 15.93 – 15.96 Mb
PubMed search
- Wikidata
View/Edit Human	View/Edit Mouse

DExH-box helicase 34 is a protein that in humans is encoded by the DHX34 gene.

== Function ==
DEAD box proteins, characterized by the conserved motif Asp-Glu-Ala-Asp (DEAD), are putative RNA helicases. They are implicated in a number of cellular processes involving alteration of RNA secondary structure such as translation initiation, nuclear and mitochondrial splicing, and ribosome and spliceosome assembly. Based on their distribution patterns, some members of this DEAD box protein family are believed to be involved in embryogenesis, spermatogenesis, and cellular growth and division. This gene encodes a member of this family. It is mapped to the glioma 19q tumor suppressor region and is a tumor suppressor candidate gene. [provided by RefSeq, Jul 2008].
