= DDX3X syndrome =

DDX3X syndrome is a genetic disorder that affects predominantly females. Patients with DDX3X syndrome may develop developmental delay or intellectual disability, autism, ADHD, and low muscle tone. The syndrome develops due to mutations of the DDX3X gene located on the X chromosome, and the clinical picture varies depending on the specific mutation.

== History ==
The syndrome was first described in a study published in 2015. The authors analyzed the genetic sequences of over 6,000 individuals with an unknown cause of intellectual disability or developmental delay. They found that mutations in the DDX3X gene were one of the more frequently identified causes of intellectual disability in that study population. They described the neurodevelopmental disorder based on the clinical findings of 38 females with de novo (new) mutations in the DDX3X gene.

== Prevalence ==
According to studies performed up to 2022, DDX3X syndrome was presumed to account for 1-3% of cases of unexplained developmental delay and/or intellectual disability in females, but this may be an approximate early estimate.

== Genetics ==
DDX3X syndrome is an X-linked condition caused by a mutation of the DDX3X gene, which is found on the X chromosome. Most cases are caused by new (de novo) mutations, but it can also be inherited. Affected females usually have de novo disease-causing mutations. Affected males may have a new disease-causing mutation or may inherit it from their mother. Female carriers with an affected son have a 50% chance of transmitting the disease-causing mutation. If inherited, male offspring are likely to develop DDX3X syndrome. It is still unclear how females who inherit the disease-causing mutation may present. So far, there are no reports of an affected female with an inherited disease-causing mutation.

Germline mosaicism has been reported in a case of two siblings with DDX3X syndrome. Germline mosaicism occurs when the disease-causing mutation is present in some of the parent's egg or sperm cells, while the rest of the cells in the parent do not carry the mutation. That mutation can then be passed down to the child during conception.

The DDX3X gene encodes a DEAD-box ATP-dependent RNA helicase, which is important for multiple processes in the body including brain development. It has also been found to have a role in the development and progression of cancer.

== Diagnosis ==
There are currently no widely accepted diagnostic criteria. The presence of intellectual disability, developmental delay, hypotonia, behavioral challenges, and brain abnormalities on MRI may suggest DDX3X syndrome. Clinical suspicion of the syndrome is confirmed with genetic testing. A gene panel that includes the DDX3X gene or exome sequencing can be used. DDX3X syndrome is diagnosed when genetic testing identifies a disease-causing mutation. Once diagnosed, parents of affected individuals should also undergo genetic testing.

== Clinical findings ==
DDX3X syndrome may present with a wide range of signs and symptoms. Mostly all individuals with DDX3X syndrome have mild to severe intellectual disability and developmental delay. Over 70% of affected individuals have hypotonia (low muscle tone), gait abnormalities or movement disorders (such as dyskinesia), GI issues (such as constipation and diarrhea) and/or sleep issues.

Other signs and symptoms may include:

- Behavioral issues
- Co-occurring psychiatric conditions including autism and ADHD
- Congenital malformations including brain abnormalities and congenital heart disease
- Vision and hearing impairment
- Seizures
- Scoliosis
- Early puberty
- Hypothyroidism
- Skin abnormalities.

Characteristic facial features have not been widely recognized. However, some common facial features among affected individuals include a long face, broad forehead, and a wide nasal bridge.

Although the DDX3X gene plays a role in cancer growth, it is still unknown whether affected individuals have an increased risk of cancer. Neuroblastoma has been reported in three individuals thus far.

== Management ==
Currently, treatment is focused on managing symptoms. At the time of diagnosis, a comprehensive neurologic assessment is recommended, along with a cardiology evaluation to look for any heart abnormalities.

Individuals with DDX3X syndrome may receive care from multiple specialists depending on the severity of their symptoms. This may include care from gastroenterology, psychiatry, ophthalmology, endocrinology, and neurology.

For individuals with intellectual and developmental disability in the United States, a referral to early intervention should be made during the first three years of life. Early intervention with occupational, physical, and speech therapy is recommended to address motor and language delay, feeding difficulties, etc. Once at school-age, an individualized education plan (IEP) should be established. An visit to see a developmental pediatrician is recommended as they can help connect families with the necessary services and therapies.

=== Preventative screenings ===
An annual vision screening is currently recommended to assess for vision impairment. During annual preventative health visits, providers should screen for early puberty, scoliosis, hearing difficulties, hypothyroidism, and skin abnormalities.

== Alternative names ==
- X-linked intellectual disability 102
- DDX3X-related neurodevelopmental disorder

== Figures ==
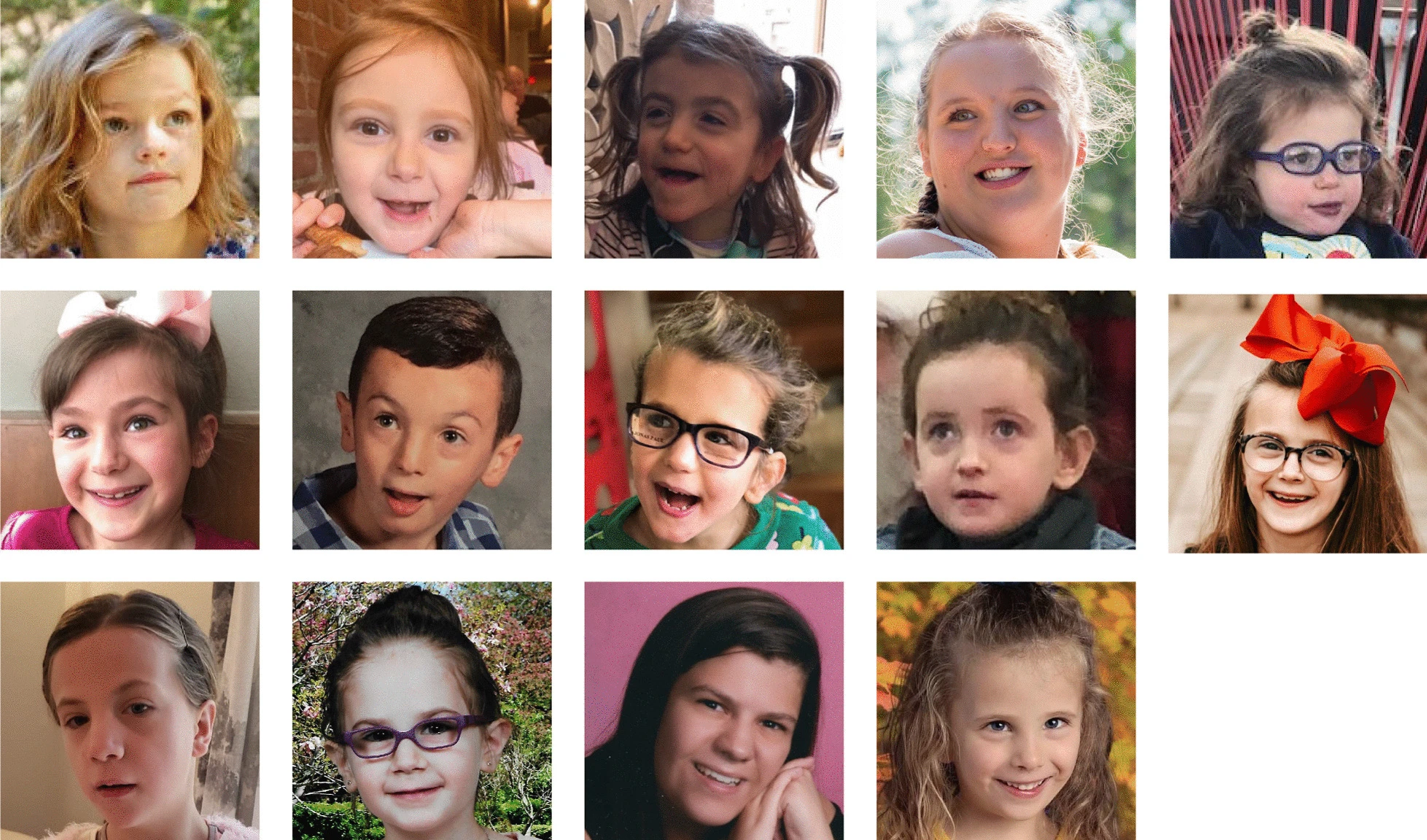
Facial features of people with DDX3X syndrome, from Tang et al., 2021.
