= DHX30 =

Gene and Protein

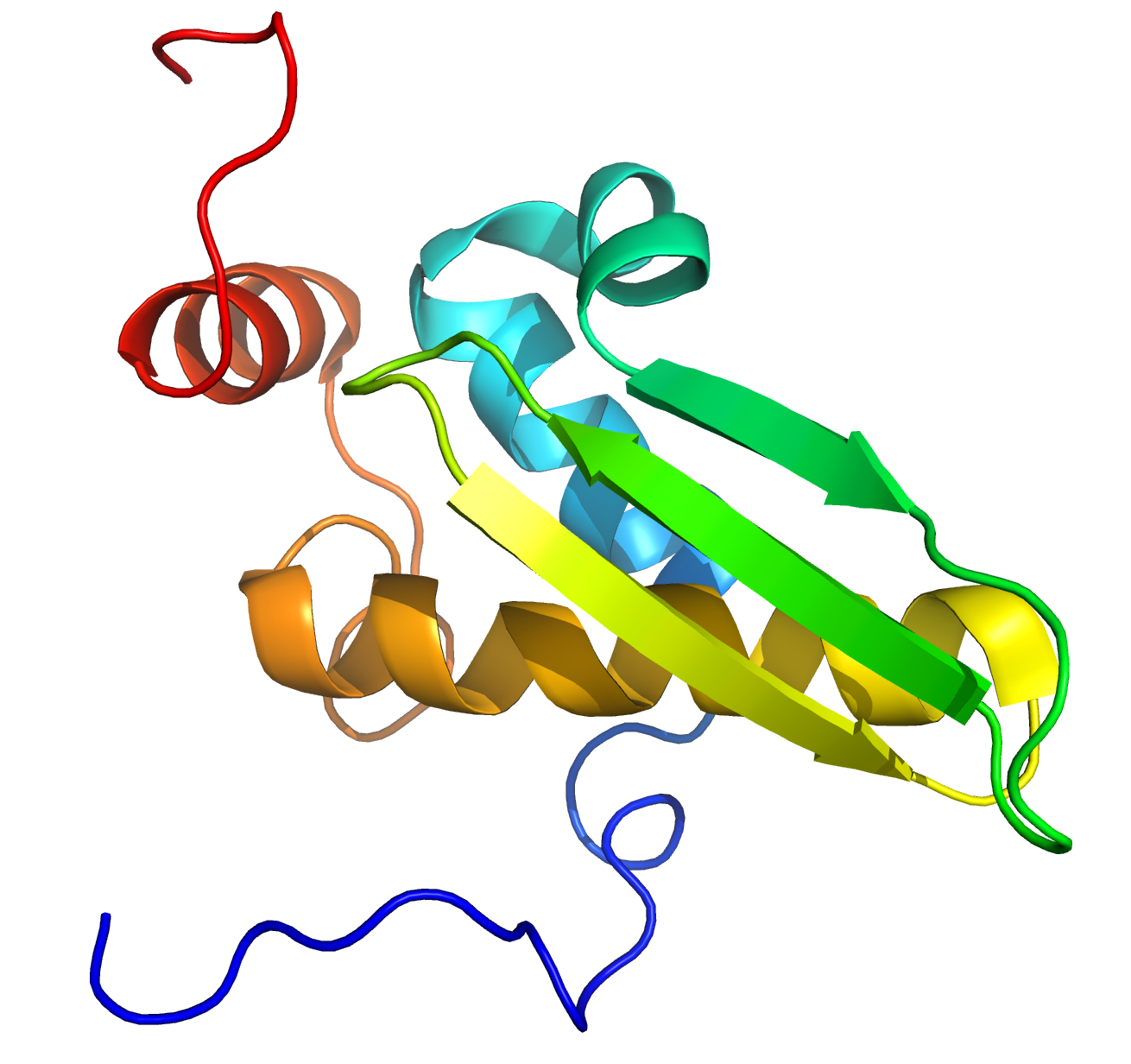
- Human DHX30 dsRBD1

Identifiers
- Aliases: DHX30, DDX30, RETCOR, DEAH-box helicase 30, DExH-box helicase 30, NEDMIAL
- External IDs: OMIM: 616423; MGI: 1920081; GeneCards: DHX30
Available structures
PDB	Ortholog search: PDBe RCSB
PDB	List of PDB id codes 2DB2
Enzyme activity
EC #	BRENDA	ExPASy	KEGG	MetaCyc
3.6.4.13	↗	↗	↗	↗

Gene location (Human)
Chr.	Chromosome 3 (human)
Band	3p21.31	Start	47,802,909 bp
Band	3p21.31	End	47,850,195 bp

Gene location (Mouse)
Chr.	Chromosome 9 (mouse)
Band	9|9 F2	Start	109,913,388 bp
Band	9|9 F2	End	109,946,898 bp
RNA expression pattern
Bgee	Human / Mouse (ortholog); Top expressed in: left testis; right testis; right hemisphere of cerebellum; ganglionic eminence; anterior pituitary; ventricular zone; right frontal lobe; right lobe of thyroid gland; right uterine tube; body of uterus / Top expressed in: Rostral migratory stream; substantia nigra; Paneth cell; medullary collecting duct; fossa; condyle; spermatocyte; renal corpuscle; seminiferous tubule; motor neuron; More reference expression data
BioGPS	n/a
Gene ontology
Molecular function	nucleotide binding; double-stranded RNA binding; chromatin binding; protein binding; hydrolase activity; ATP binding; helicase activity; nucleic acid binding; RNA binding; G-quadruplex RNA binding; DNA helicase activity; 3'-5' RNA helicase activity
Cellular component	ribonucleoprotein granule; mitochondrial nucleoid; mitochondrion; cytoplasm; cytosol; nucleus
Biological process	RNA processing; ribosome biogenesis; mitochondrial large ribosomal subunit assembly; central nervous system development; DNA duplex unwinding
Sources:Amigo / QuickGO
Orthologs
Databases	NCBI: entry; OMA: entry
Species	Human	Mouse
Entrez	22907	72831
Ensembl	ENSG00000132153	ENSMUSG00000032480
UniProt	Q7L2E3	Q99PU8
RefSeq (mRNA)	NM_014966; NM_138614; NM_138615; NM_001330990	NM_001252682; NM_001252683; NM_133347
RefSeq (protein)	NP_001317919; NP_055781; NP_619520	NP_001239611; NP_001239612; NP_579925
Location (UCSC)	Chr 3: 47.8 – 47.85 Mb	Chr 9: 109.91 – 109.95 Mb
PubMed search
- Wikidata
View/Edit Human	View/Edit Mouse

The ATP-dependent RNA helicase DHX30 is an enzyme that in humans is encoded by the DHX30 (DExH-Box Helicase 30) gene.

DHX30 is one of many RNA helicases in the DExH superfamily, which unwind double-stranded sections of RNA or RNA/DNA hybrids and restructure RNA/protein complexes. Disease-causing (pathogenic) mutations in the DHX30 gene cause DHX30 syndrome, which can include symptoms such as global developmental delay, intellectual disability, severe speech impairment, gait abnormalities, low muscle tone, autistic features, and seizures.

== Function ==
There are 6 known superfamilies of RNA helicases. DHX30 belongs to superfamily 2, which is characterized by a DExH or DExD signature in the ATP-binding motif II, and contains >50 human gene members. These RNA helicases bind and hydrolyze ATP, and their main function is to bind and unwind nucleic acids.

Expression of DHX30 is ubiquitous, and found in the brain from early embryonic stages through at least 6 years of age. Like other DExH helicases, DHX30 enzyme is a processive helicase, which unwinds double-stranded RNA as it moves. The DHX30 gene has two promoters, and the alternatively spliced isoform contains a predicted mitochondrial targeting sequence. DHX30 is localized to and active in both the cytosol and mitochondria and thought to link mitochondrial function, ribosome biogenesis, and global translation. DHX30 functions within stress granules, which are large protein/RNA complexes in the cytoplasm where mRNAs are sequestered during translation shutdown events resulting from cellular stresses. DHX30 protein is also localized to mitochondrial RNA granules, with roles in RNA processing and mitochondrial ribosome biogenesis. DHX30 is also a mitochondrial G-quadruplex binding protein, and can unfold mitochondrial DNA G-quadruplex structures.

== Structure ==
Starting from the N-terminus, the human DHX30 protein contains two double stranded RNA-binding domains (dsRBD1, residues 53–145, and dsRBD2, residues 245–338), a central helicase core consisting of an ATP-binding RecA-like domain (residues 444–612) and a helicase C-terminal RecA-like domain (residues 654–827) followed by winged-helix (WH), rachet-like (RL) and oligosaccharide binding (OB) domains. The presence of C-terminal WH, RL, and OB domains are a distinguishing characteristic of DExH helicases that provide a binding tunnel for single stranded RNA as it is unwound from double stranded RNA.

== Clinical significance ==
=== DHX30 syndrome ===
Several different helicases are specifically needed for each gene’s precise expression and RNA metabolism. Neurons appear to have exacting requirements for proteins involved in RNA metabolism, as neurodevelopmental disorders are observed in individuals with pathogenic mutations in many of the genes involved in RNA metabolic processes, including 5 DEAH-box RNA helicases (DHX9, DHX30, DHX37, DHX16, and DHX34) and 7 DEAD-box RNA helicases (DDX3X, DDX6, EIF4A2, DDX23, DDX54, DDX59, and EIF4A3).

DHX30, as with many DEAD/DEAH-box RNA helicases, are intolerant to missense mutation. Heterozygous missense, frameshift, and nonsense DHX30 variants are seen in humans and cause the neurodevelopmental disorder DHX30 syndrome (OMIM*616423), formerly known as NEDMIAL (Neurodevelopmental Disorder characterized with severe Motor Impairment and Absent Language, OMIM* 617804), also known as DHX30-associated neurodevelopmental disorders. DHX30’s RNA helicase activity is disrupted by missense variants in its helicase core motifs by impairing either its ATPase activity or RNA binding ability. It appears that stress granules form aberrantly when DHX30 is mutated, reducing global translation.

Individuals with DHX30 syndrome may have all or some of the following symptoms, with differing severity: global developmental delay, intellectual disability, severe speech impairment, ataxia, hypotonia, differences in brain structure, strabismus, autistic features, and seizures.

=== Role in cancer ===
DHX30 has been shown to interact with pro-apoptotic transcripts in cancer cells, reducing the chance of apoptosis, which suggests a possible role as a future target in cancer therapeutic development.

== Interactions ==
- FASTKD2
- FASTKD5
- MRPL11
- MPRS22
- Ribosomal subunit 80s
- Mitochondrial endonuclease G (EndoG) (Xu et al., (2025)

== See also ==
- DHX30 syndrome
- Eukaryotic translation
- DExD/H box proteins
- DDX3X
- Neurodevelopmental disorder
- DEAD box
- RNA helicase
- RNA helicase database
