= MRPS18B =

Protein-coding gene in the species Homo sapiens

Identifiers
- Aliases: MRPS18B, C6orf14, HSPC183, HumanS18a, MRP-S18-2, MRPS18-2, PTD017, S18amt, mitochondrial ribosomal protein S18B
- External IDs: OMIM: 611982; MGI: 1914223; GeneCards: MRPS18B
Available structures
PDB	Ortholog search: PDBe RCSB
PDB	List of PDB id codes 3J9M

Gene location (Human)
Chr.	Chromosome 6 (human)
Band	6p21.33	Start	30,617,840 bp
Band	6p21.33	End	30,626,395 bp

Gene location (Mouse)
Chr.	Chromosome 17 (mouse)
Band	17|17 B1	Start	36,221,271 bp
Band	17|17 B1	End	36,227,281 bp
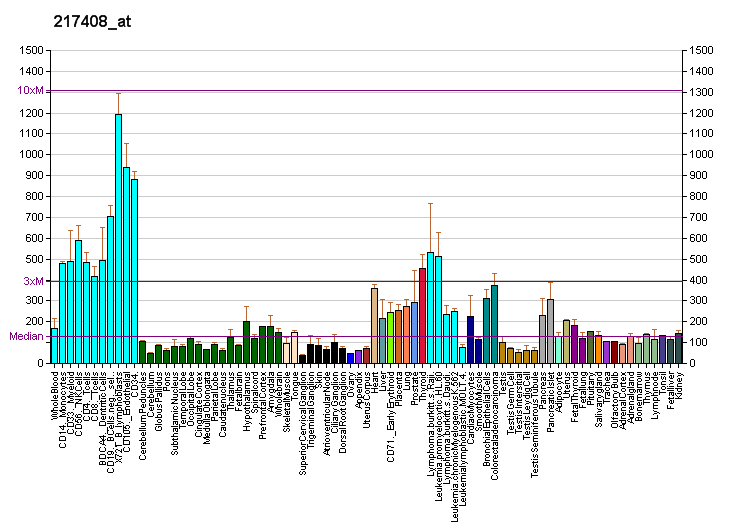

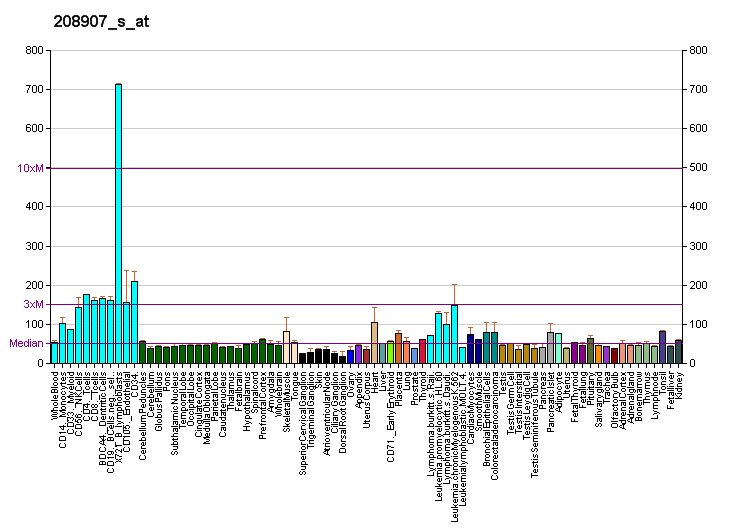
RNA expression pattern
Bgee	Human / Mouse (ortholog); Top expressed in: gastrocnemius muscle; muscle of thigh; skeletal muscle tissue; left ventricle; apex of heart; islet of Langerhans; human kidney; rectum; right adrenal gland; body of pancreas / Top expressed in: morula; blastocyst; embryo; epiblast; embryo; proximal tubule; adrenal gland; white adipose tissue; muscle of thigh; placenta; More reference expression data
BioGPS	More reference expression data
Gene ontology
Molecular function	structural constituent of ribosome; protein binding
Cellular component	cell junction; ribosome; nucleoplasm; intracellular anatomical structure; mitochondrial inner membrane; mitochondrial small ribosomal subunit; mitochondrion
Biological process	mitochondrial translational elongation; protein biosynthesis; mitochondrial translational termination; mitochondrial translation
Sources:Amigo / QuickGO
Orthologs
Databases	NCBI: entry; OMA: entry
Species	Human	Mouse
Entrez	28973	66973
Ensembl	ENSG00000229861; ENSG00000226111; ENSG00000204568; ENSG00000203624; ENSG00000227420 ENSG00000233813; ENSG00000223775	ENSMUSG00000024436
UniProt	Q9Y676	Q99N84
RefSeq (mRNA)	NM_014046	NM_025878; NM_001347380; NM_001361453; NM_001361454; NM_001361455
RefSeq (protein)	NP_054765	NP_001334309; NP_080154; NP_001348382; NP_001348383; NP_001348384
Location (UCSC)	Chr 6: 30.62 – 30.63 Mb	Chr 17: 36.22 – 36.23 Mb
PubMed search
- Wikidata
View/Edit Human	View/Edit Mouse

28S ribosomal protein S18b, mitochondrial is a protein that in humans is encoded by the MRPS18B gene.

Mammalian mitochondrial ribosomal proteins are encoded by nuclear genes and help in protein synthesis within the mitochondrion. Mitochondrial ribosomes (mitoribosomes) consist of a small 28S subunit and a large 39S subunit. They have an estimated 75% protein to rRNA composition compared to prokaryotic ribosomes, where this ratio is reversed.

Another difference between mammalian mitoribosomes and prokaryotic ribosomes is that the latter contain a 5S rRNA. Among different species, the proteins comprising the mitoribosome differ greatly in sequence, and sometimes in biochemical properties, which prevents easy recognition by sequence homology. This gene encodes a 28S subunit protein that belongs to the ribosomal protein S18P family. The encoded protein is one of three that has significant sequence similarity to bacterial S18 proteins. The primary sequences of the three human mitochondrial S18 proteins are no more closely related to each other than they are to the prokaryotic S18 proteins. Pseudogenes corresponding to this gene are found on chromosomes 1q and 2q.
