= IRF2BP2 =

Protein-coding gene in humans

Identifiers
- Aliases: IRF2BP2, interferon regulatory factor 2 binding protein 2, CVID14
- External IDs: OMIM: 615332; MGI: 2443921; GeneCards: IRF2BP2

Gene location (Human)
Chr.	Chromosome 1 (human)
Band	1q42.3	Start	234,604,269 bp
Band	1q42.3	End	234,610,178 bp

Gene location (Mouse)
Chr.	Chromosome 8 (mouse)
Band	8|8 E2	Start	127,315,035 bp
Band	8|8 E2	End	127,320,725 bp
RNA expression pattern
Bgee	Human / Mouse (ortholog); Top expressed in: epithelium of lactiferous gland; lactiferous duct; trachea; pancreatic epithelial cell; mucosa of paranasal sinus; superior surface of tongue; pylorus; trigeminal ganglion; tail of epididymis; caput epididymis / Top expressed in: aortic valve; ascending aorta; molar; hand; stroma of bone marrow; left lung lobe; left colon; body of femur; foot; right lung lobe; More reference expression data
BioGPS	n/a
Gene ontology
Molecular function	metal ion binding; RNA polymerase II transcription regulatory region sequence-specific DNA binding; DNA-binding transcription repressor activity, RNA polymerase II-specific; DNA-binding transcription activator activity, RNA polymerase II-specific
Cellular component	cytoplasm; nucleus; nucleoplasm
Biological process	transcription, DNA-templated; regulation of transcription, DNA-templated; immature B cell differentiation; negative regulation of transcription by RNA polymerase II; positive regulation of transcription by RNA polymerase II
Sources:Amigo / QuickGO
Orthologs
Databases	NCBI: entry; OMA: entry
Species	Human	Mouse
Entrez	359948	270110
Ensembl	ENSG00000168264	ENSMUSG00000051495
UniProt	Q7Z5L9	E9Q1P8
RefSeq (mRNA)	NM_182972; NM_001077397	NM_001164598
RefSeq (protein)	NP_001070865; NP_892017	NP_001158070
Location (UCSC)	Chr 1: 234.6 – 234.61 Mb	Chr 8: 127.32 – 127.32 Mb
PubMed search
- Wikidata
View/Edit Human	View/Edit Mouse

Interferon regulatory factor 2 binding protein 2 is a protein that in humans is encoded by the IRF2BP2 gene.

== Function ==
This gene encodes an interferon regulatory factor-2 (IRF2) binding protein that interacts with the C-terminal transcriptional repression domain of IRF2. Alternative splicing results in multiple transcript variants encoding distinct isoforms.
