= DDX59 =

Protein-coding gene in humans

Identifiers
- Aliases: DDX59, OFD5, ZNHIT5, DEAD-box helicase 59
- External IDs: OMIM: 615464; MGI: 1915247; GeneCards: DDX59
Available structures
PDB	Ortholog search: PDBe RCSB
PDB	List of PDB id codes 2YQP
Enzyme activity
EC #	BRENDA	ExPASy	KEGG	MetaCyc
3.6.4.13	↗	↗	↗	↗

Gene location (Human)
Chr.	Chromosome 1 (human)
Band	1q32.1	Start	200,623,896 bp
Band	1q32.1	End	200,669,907 bp

Gene location (Mouse)
Chr.	Chromosome 1 (mouse)
Band	1|1 E4	Start	136,343,009 bp
Band	1|1 E4	End	136,367,896 bp
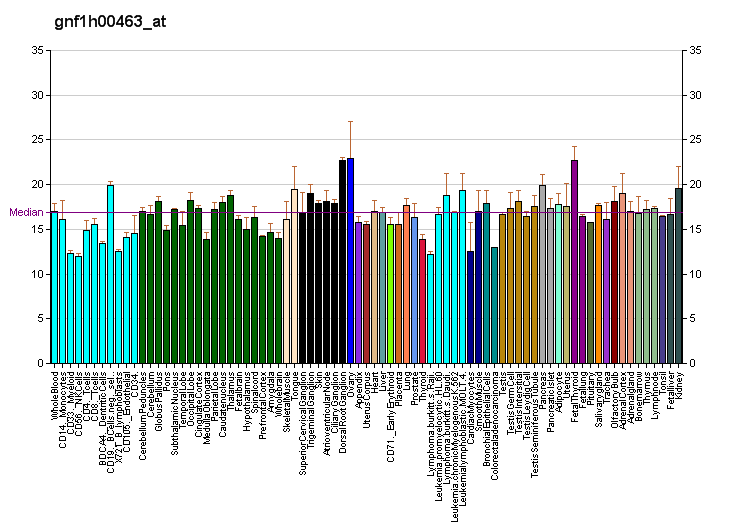
RNA expression pattern
Bgee	Human / Mouse (ortholog); Top expressed in: buccal mucosa cell; pancreatic ductal cell; tendon of biceps brachii; oocyte; secondary oocyte; cardia; endothelial cell; mucosa of paranasal sinus; renal medulla; nipple / Top expressed in: saccule; ectoderm; otic vesicle; otic placode; secondary oocyte; molar; medullary collecting duct; zygote; interventricular septum; muscle of thigh; More reference expression data
BioGPS	More reference expression data
Gene ontology
Molecular function	nucleotide binding; hydrolase activity; ATP binding; helicase activity; metal ion binding; RNA binding; nucleic acid binding
Cellular component	intracellular anatomical structure; nucleus; nucleolus; cytoplasm; membrane; integral component of membrane
Biological process	RNA secondary structure unwinding
Sources:Amigo / QuickGO
Orthologs
Databases	NCBI: entry; OMA: entry
Species	Human	Mouse
Entrez	83479	67997
Ensembl	ENSG00000118197	ENSMUSG00000026404
UniProt	Q5T1V6; Q5T1W1	Q9DBN9
RefSeq (mRNA)	NM_001031725; NM_031306; NM_001320181; NM_001320182; NM_001349799 NM_001349800; NM_001349801; NM_001349802; NM_001349803; NM_001349804	NM_026500; NM_178052
RefSeq (protein)	NP_001026895; NP_001307110; NP_001307111; NP_001336728; NP_001336729 NP_001336730; NP_001336731; NP_001336732; NP_001336733	NP_080776
Location (UCSC)	Chr 1: 200.62 – 200.67 Mb	Chr 1: 136.34 – 136.37 Mb
PubMed search
- Wikidata
View/Edit Human	View/Edit Mouse

Probable ATP-dependent RNA helicase DDX59 is an enzyme that in humans is encoded by the DDX59 gene.
