= DDX1 =

Protein-coding gene in the species Homo sapiens

Identifiers
- Aliases: DDX1, DBP-RB, UKVH5d, DEAD/H-box helicase 1, DEAD-box helicase 1
- External IDs: OMIM: 601257; MGI: 2144727; GeneCards: DDX1
Available structures
PDB	Ortholog search: PDBe RCSB
PDB	List of PDB id codes 4XW3
Enzyme activity
EC #	BRENDA	ExPASy	KEGG	MetaCyc
3.6.4.13	↗	↗	↗	↗

Gene location (Human)
Chr.	Chromosome 2 (human)
Band	2p24.3	Start	15,591,178 bp
Band	2p24.3	End	15,634,346 bp

Gene location (Mouse)
Chr.	Chromosome 12 (mouse)
Band	12|12 A1.1	Start	13,266,974 bp
Band	12|12 A1.1	End	13,299,214 bp
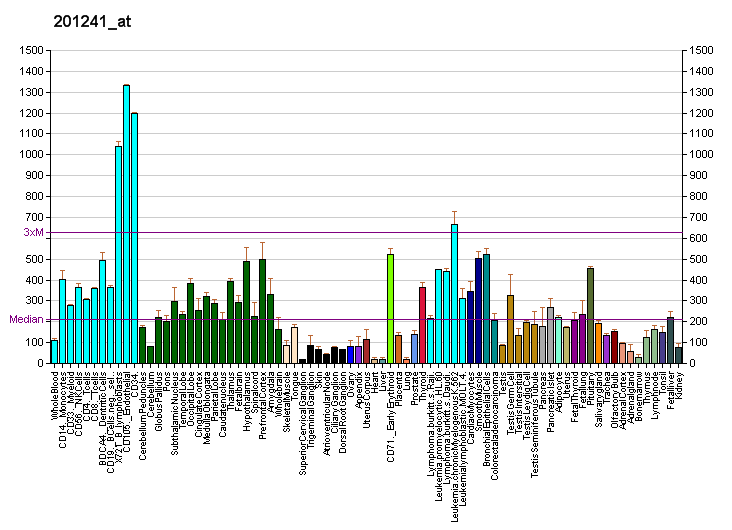
RNA expression pattern
Bgee	Human / Mouse (ortholog); Top expressed in: Skeletal muscle tissue of biceps brachii; right ventricle; deltoid muscle; triceps brachii muscle; middle temporal gyrus; tendon of biceps brachii; parotid gland; glutes; Skeletal muscle tissue of rectus abdominis; islet of Langerhans / Top expressed in: primitive streak; spermatid; spermatocyte; ventricular zone; epiblast; maxillary prominence; mandibular prominence; dentate gyrus of hippocampal formation granule cell; triceps brachii muscle; temporal muscle; More reference expression data
BioGPS	More reference expression data
Gene ontology
Molecular function	RNA helicase activity; DNA binding; nucleotide binding; helicase activity; poly(A) binding; chromatin binding; transcription coregulator activity; DNA/RNA helicase activity; protein binding; nucleic acid binding; nuclease activity; double-stranded RNA binding; exonuclease activity; hydrolase activity; ATP binding; RNA binding
Cellular component	cytoplasm; membrane; nucleoplasm; tRNA-splicing ligase complex; cytoplasmic stress granule; cleavage body; nucleus; cytosol; nucleolus; mitochondrion; ribonucleoprotein complex
Biological process	regulation of transcription, DNA-templated; response to exogenous dsRNA; mRNA processing; response to virus; protein localization to cytoplasmic stress granule; transcription, DNA-templated; multicellular organism development; spliceosomal complex assembly; DNA duplex unwinding; double-strand break repair; RNA secondary structure unwinding; regulation of translational initiation; tRNA splicing, via endonucleolytic cleavage and ligation; tRNA processing; nucleic acid phosphodiester bond hydrolysis; immune system process; positive regulation of myeloid dendritic cell cytokine production; positive regulation of I-kappaB kinase/NF-kappaB signaling; innate immune response; defense response to virus; regulation of nucleic acid-templated transcription
Sources:Amigo / QuickGO
Orthologs
Databases	NCBI: entry; OMA: entry
Species	Human	Mouse
Entrez	1653	104721
Ensembl	ENSG00000079785	ENSMUSG00000037149
UniProt	Q92499	Q91VR5
RefSeq (mRNA)	NM_004939	NM_134040
RefSeq (protein)	NP_004930	NP_598801
Location (UCSC)	Chr 2: 15.59 – 15.63 Mb	Chr 12: 13.27 – 13.3 Mb
PubMed search
- Wikidata
View/Edit Human	View/Edit Mouse

ATP-dependent RNA helicase DDX1 is an enzyme that in humans is encoded by the DDX1 gene.

== Function ==
DEAD box proteins, characterized by the conserved motif Asp-Glu-Ala-Asp (DEAD), are putative RNA helicases. They are implicated in a number of cellular processes involving alteration of RNA secondary structure such as translation initiation, nuclear and mitochondrial splicing, and ribosome and spliceosome assembly. Based on their distribution patterns, some members of this family are believed to be involved in embryogenesis, spermatogenesis, and cellular growth and division. This gene encodes a DEAD box protein of unknown function. It shows high transcription levels in 2 retinoblastoma cell lines and in tissues of neuroectodermal origin.

== Interactions ==
DDX1 has been shown to interact with HNRPK. DDX1 has also been tentatively shown to interact with hCLE/C14orf166/RTRAF and HSPC117 in a cap-binding complex that activates mRNA translation.
