= Mitochondrial ribosomal protein S22 =

Protein-coding gene in the species Homo sapiens

MRPS22

Identifiers
- Aliases: MRPS22, C3orf5, COXPD5, GIBT, MRP-S22, RPMS22, GK002, mitochondrial ribosomal protein S22, ODG7
- External IDs: OMIM: 605810; MGI: 1928137; GeneCards: MRPS22
Available structures
PDB	Ortholog search: PDBe RCSB
PDB	List of PDB id codes 3J9M

Gene location (Human)
Chr.	Chromosome 3 (human)
Band	3q23	Start	139,005,806 bp
Band	3q23	End	139,360,497 bp

Gene location (Mouse)
Chr.	Chromosome 9 (mouse)
Band	9|9 E3.3	Start	98,470,783 bp
Band	9|9 E3.3	End	98,483,713 bp
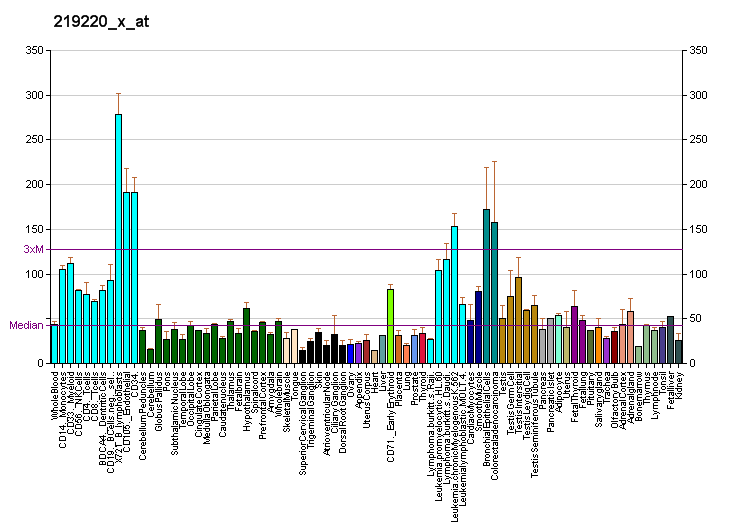
RNA expression pattern
Bgee	Human / Mouse (ortholog); Top expressed in: right adrenal gland; right adrenal cortex; gonad; Achilles tendon; tibialis anterior muscle; left adrenal gland; endothelial cell; myocardium of left ventricle; deltoid muscle; left adrenal cortex / Top expressed in: primary oocyte; medial ganglionic eminence; maxillary prominence; mandibular prominence; abdominal wall; renal corpuscle; facial motor nucleus; medullary collecting duct; ureter; atrioventricular valve; More reference expression data
BioGPS	More reference expression data
Gene ontology
Molecular function	structural constituent of ribosome
Cellular component	mitochondrial inner membrane; ribosome; mitochondrial ribosome; mitochondrion; mitochondrial small ribosomal subunit
Biological process	mitochondrial translational elongation; mitochondrial translational termination; biological process
Sources:Amigo / QuickGO
Orthologs
Databases	NCBI: entry; OMA: entry
Species	Human	Mouse
Entrez	56945	64655
Ensembl	ENSG00000175110	ENSMUSG00000032459
UniProt	P82650	Q9CXW2
RefSeq (mRNA)	NM_020191; NM_001363857; NM_001363893	NM_025485
RefSeq (protein)	NP_064576; NP_001350786; NP_001350822	NP_079761
Location (UCSC)	Chr 3: 139.01 – 139.36 Mb	Chr 9: 98.47 – 98.48 Mb
PubMed search
- Wikidata
View/Edit Human	View/Edit Mouse

28S ribosomal protein S22, mitochondrial is a protein that in humans is encoded by the MRPS22 gene.

Mammalian mitochondrial ribosomal proteins are encoded by nuclear genes and help in protein synthesis within the mitochondrion. Mitochondrial ribosomes (mitoribosomes) consist of a small 28S subunit and a large 39S subunit. They have an estimated 75% protein to rRNA composition compared to prokaryotic ribosomes, where this ratio is reversed. Another difference between mammalian mitoribosomes and prokaryotic ribosomes is that the latter contain a 5S rRNA. Among different species, the proteins comprising the mitoribosome differ greatly in sequence, and sometimes in biochemical properties, which prevents easy recognition by sequence homology. This gene encodes a 28S subunit protein that does not seem to have a counterpart in prokaryotic and fungal-mitochondrial ribosomes. This gene lies telomeric of and is transcribed in the opposite direction from the forkhead box L2 gene. A pseudogene corresponding to this gene is found on chromosome Xq.
