= Phostensin =

Protein-coding gene in the species Homo sapiens

PPP1R18

Identifiers
- Aliases: PPP1R18, HKMT1098, KIAA1949, protein phosphatase 1 regulatory subunit 18
- External IDs: OMIM: 610990; MGI: 1923698; GeneCards: PPP1R18

Gene location (Human)
Chr.	Chromosome 6 (human)
Band	6p21.33	Start	30,676,389 bp
Band	6p21.33	End	30,687,895 bp

Gene location (Mouse)
Chr.	Chromosome 17 (mouse)
Band	17|17 B1	Start	36,176,485 bp
Band	17|17 B1	End	36,186,488 bp
RNA expression pattern
Bgee	Human / Mouse (ortholog); Top expressed in: granulocyte; blood; lymph node; spleen; monocyte; appendix; right coronary artery; Descending thoracic aorta; ascending aorta; bone marrow / Top expressed in: granulocyte; mesenteric lymph nodes; tibiofemoral joint; thymus; blood; spleen; stroma of bone marrow; Ileal epithelium; lactiferous gland; subcutaneous adipose tissue; More reference expression data
BioGPS	n/a
Orthologs
Databases	NCBI: entry; OMA: entry
Species	Human	Mouse
Entrez	170954	76448
Ensembl	ENSG00000229998; ENSG00000230341; ENSG00000225060; ENSG00000236428; ENSG00000146112 ENSG00000206485; ENSG00000231247; ENSG00000234000	ENSMUSG00000034595
UniProt	Q6NYC8	Q8BQ30
RefSeq (mRNA)	NM_001134870; NM_133471	NM_001146710; NM_001146711; NM_175242; NM_001378889
RefSeq (protein)	NP_001128342; NP_597728	NP_001140182; NP_001140183; NP_780451; NP_001365818
Location (UCSC)	Chr 6: 30.68 – 30.69 Mb	Chr 17: 36.18 – 36.19 Mb
PubMed search
- Wikidata
View/Edit Human	View/Edit Mouse

Phostensin is a protein that in humans is encoded by the PPP1R18 gene.
