= DDX23 =

Protein-coding gene in humans

Identifiers
- Aliases: DDX23, PRPF28, SNRNP100, U5-100K, U5-100KD, prp28, DEAD-box helicase 23
- External IDs: OMIM: 612172; MGI: 1921601; GeneCards: DDX23
Available structures
PDB	Human UniProt search: PDBe RCSB
PDB	List of PDB id codes 4NHO, 3JCR
Enzyme activity
EC #	BRENDA	ExPASy	KEGG	MetaCyc
3.6.4.13	↗	↗	↗	↗

Gene location (Human)
Chr.	Chromosome 12 (human)
Band	12q13.12	Start	48,829,756 bp
Band	12q13.12	End	48,852,842 bp

Gene location (Mouse)
Chr.	Chromosome 15 (mouse)
Band	15|15 F1	Start	98,543,015 bp
Band	15|15 F1	End	98,560,775 bp
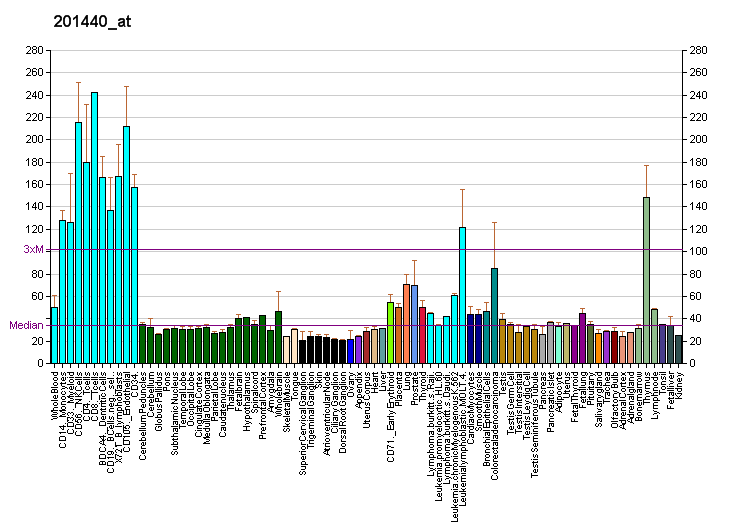

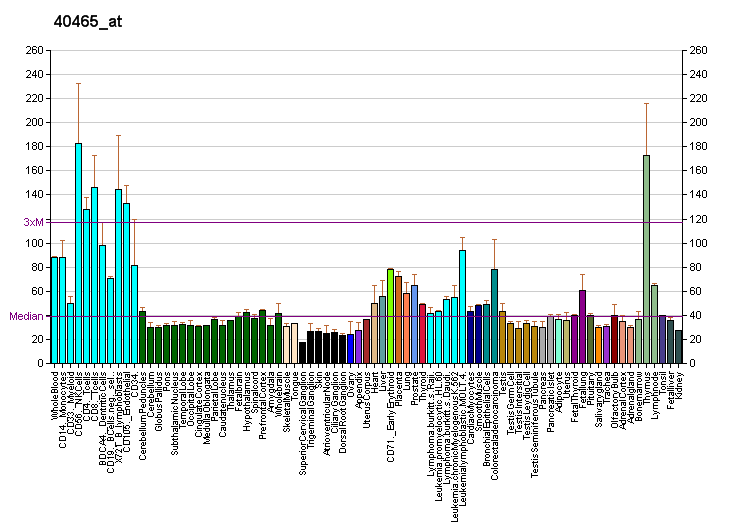
RNA expression pattern
Bgee	Human / Mouse (ortholog); Top expressed in: Achilles tendon; sural nerve; granulocyte; ventricular zone; right uterine tube; body of stomach; ganglionic eminence; rectum; right lobe of thyroid gland; transverse colon / Top expressed in: neural layer of retina; ventricular zone; muscle of thigh; yolk sac; tail of embryo; esophagus; superior frontal gyrus; genital tubercle; dentate gyrus of hippocampal formation granule cell; lip; More reference expression data
BioGPS	More reference expression data
Gene ontology
Molecular function	nucleotide binding; helicase activity; protein binding; nucleic acid binding; hydrolase activity; ATP binding; RNA binding
Cellular component	catalytic step 2 spliceosome; U5 snRNP; nucleoplasm; spliceosomal complex; extracellular exosome; nucleus; nucleolus; cytoplasm
Biological process	mRNA splicing, via spliceosome; RNA splicing, via transesterification reactions; mRNA processing; RNA secondary structure unwinding; RNA splicing; cis assembly of pre-catalytic spliceosome
Sources:Amigo / QuickGO
Orthologs
Databases	NCBI: entry; OMA: entry
Species	Human	Mouse
Entrez	9416	74351
Ensembl	ENSG00000174243	ENSMUSG00000003360
UniProt	Q9BUQ8	n/a
RefSeq (mRNA)	NM_004818	NM_001080981
RefSeq (protein)	NP_004809	n/a
Location (UCSC)	Chr 12: 48.83 – 48.85 Mb	Chr 15: 98.54 – 98.56 Mb
PubMed search
- Wikidata
View/Edit Human	View/Edit Mouse

Probable ATP-dependent RNA helicase DDX23 is an enzyme that in humans is encoded by the DDX23 gene.

This gene encodes a member of the DEAD box protein family. DEAD box proteins, characterized by the conserved motif Asp-Glu-Ala-Asp (DEAD), are putative RNA helicases. They are implicated in a number of cellular processes involving alteration of RNA secondary structure, such as translation initiation, nuclear and mitochondrial splicing, and ribosome and spliceosome assembly. Based on their distribution patterns, some members of this family are believed to be involved in embryogenesis, spermatogenesis, and cellular growth and division. The protein encoded by this gene is a component of the U5 snRNP complex; it may facilitate conformational changes in the spliceosome during nuclear pre-mRNA splicing. An alternatively spliced transcript variant has been found for this gene, but its biological validity has not been determined.
