= NTP binding site =

An NTP binding site is a type of binding site found in nucleoside monophosphate (NMP) kinases, N can be adenosine or guanosine. A P-loop is one of the structural motifs common for nucleoside triphosphate (NTP) binding sites, it interacts with the bound nucleotide's phosphoryl groups. For the binding site to be able to bind a nucleotide, the nucleotide must be complex bound to Mg^{2+} or Mn^{2+}. Nucleotide binding will cause conformational changes in the protein because the P-loop will bend.

NTP binding sites play a role in poliovirus RNA replication. On the poliovirus RNA-dependent polymerase, also known as 3D^{pol}, there are two binding sites. Both binding sites contain lysine residues; however, only the lysine at position 61 is essential for RNA sequence elongation as part of the replication process. Additionally, a method known as computational alanine mutagenesis, has been used to find the key portions within the amino acid sequences that majorly characterize a particular NTP binding site; these regions within the sequence are conserved.
