= DHX16 =

Protein-coding gene in the species Homo sapiens

Identifiers
- Aliases: DHX16, DBP2, DDX16, PRO2014, PRP8, PRPF2, Prp2, DEAH-box helicase 16, NMOAS
- External IDs: OMIM: 603405; MGI: 1916442; GeneCards: DHX16
Enzyme activity
EC #	BRENDA	ExPASy	KEGG	MetaCyc
3.6.4.13	↗	↗	↗	↗

Gene location (Human)
Chr.	Chromosome 6 (human)
Band	6p21.33	Start	30,653,119 bp
Band	6p21.33	End	30,673,006 bp

Gene location (Mouse)
Chr.	Chromosome 17 (mouse)
Band	17|17 B1	Start	36,190,711 bp
Band	17|17 B1	End	36,203,562 bp
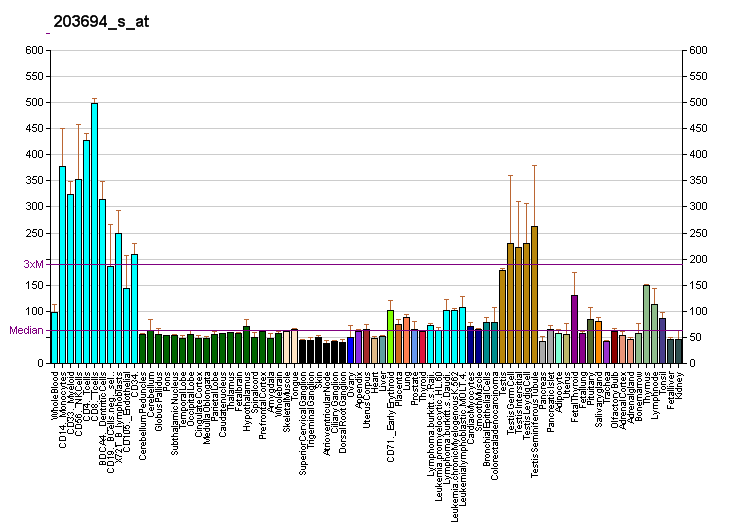
RNA expression pattern
Bgee	Human / Mouse (ortholog); Top expressed in: sural nerve; granulocyte; left testis; right testis; right uterine tube; right lobe of thyroid gland; left lobe of thyroid gland; spleen; minor salivary glands; duodenum / Top expressed in: neural layer of retina; granulocyte; morula; morula; thymus; ventricular zone; epiblast; blastocyst; medullary collecting duct; hair follicle; More reference expression data
BioGPS	More reference expression data
Gene ontology
Molecular function	RNA helicase activity; nucleotide binding; protein binding; ATP binding; helicase activity; hydrolase activity; nucleic acid binding; ATPase activity; RNA binding; 3'-5' RNA helicase activity
Cellular component	spliceosomal complex; nucleus; cytoplasm; nucleoplasm; U2-type precatalytic spliceosome
Biological process	mRNA processing; RNA splicing; mRNA splicing, via spliceosome; metabolism
Sources:Amigo / QuickGO
Orthologs
Databases	NCBI: entry; OMA: entry
Species	Human	Mouse
Entrez	8449	69192
Ensembl	ENSG00000233561; ENSG00000206486; ENSG00000233418; ENSG00000231377; ENSG00000227222 ENSG00000204560; ENSG00000233049; ENSG00000226171	ENSMUSG00000024422
UniProt	O60231; Q5SQH5	n/a
RefSeq (mRNA)	NM_001164239; NM_003587; NM_001363515	NM_026987
RefSeq (protein)	NP_001157711; NP_003578; NP_001350444	n/a
Location (UCSC)	Chr 6: 30.65 – 30.67 Mb	Chr 17: 36.19 – 36.2 Mb
PubMed search
- Wikidata
View/Edit Human	View/Edit Mouse

Putative pre-mRNA-splicing factor ATP-dependent RNA helicase DHX16 is an enzyme that in humans is encoded by the DHX16 gene.

DEAD box proteins, characterized by the conserved motif Asp-Glu-Ala-Asp (DEAD), are putative RNA helicases. They are implicated in a number of cellular processes involving alteration of RNA secondary structure such as translation initiation, nuclear and mitochondrial splicing, and ribosome and spliceosome assembly. Based on their distribution patterns, some members of this family are believed to be involved in embryogenesis, spermatogenesis, and cellular growth and division. This gene encodes a DEAD box protein, which is a functional homolog of fission yeast Prp8 protein involved in cell cycle progression. This gene is mapped to the MHC region on chromosome 6p21.3, a region where many malignant, genetic and autoimmune disease genes are linked.
