= DDX3X =

Protein-coding gene in humans

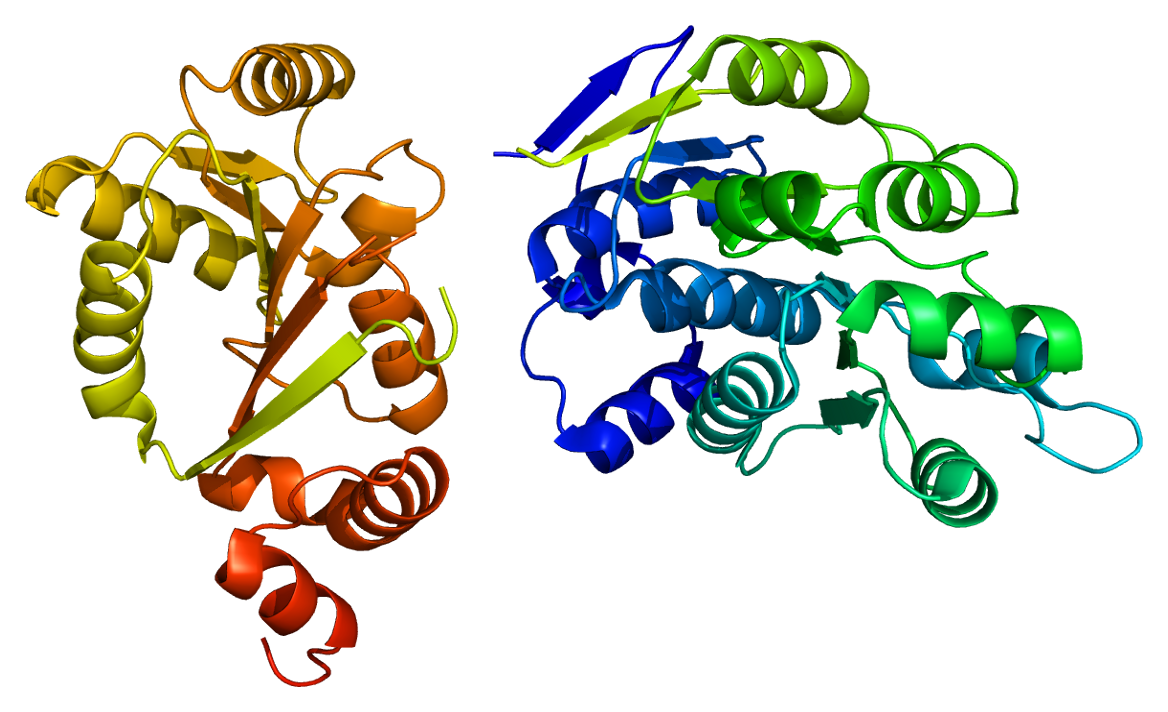

Identifiers
- Aliases: DDX3X, DBX, DDX14, DDX3, HLP2, CAP-Rf, MRX102, DEAD-box helicase 3, X-linked, DEAD-box helicase 3 X-linked, MRXSSB
- External IDs: OMIM: 300160; MGI: 103064; GeneCards: DDX3X
Available structures
PDB	Ortholog search: PDBe RCSB
PDB	List of PDB id codes 2I4I, 2JGN, 3JRV, 4O2C, 4O2E, 4O2F, 4PX9, 4PXA, 5E7J, 5E7M, 5E7I
Enzyme activity
EC #	BRENDA	ExPASy	KEGG	MetaCyc
3.6.4.13	↗	↗	↗	↗

Gene location (Human)
Chr.	X chromosome (human)
Band	Xp11.4	Start	41,333,348 bp
Band	Xp11.4	End	41,364,472 bp

Gene location (Mouse)
Chr.	X chromosome (mouse)
Band	X A1.1|X 8.17 cM	Start	13,147,209 bp
Band	X A1.1|X 8.17 cM	End	13,160,291 bp
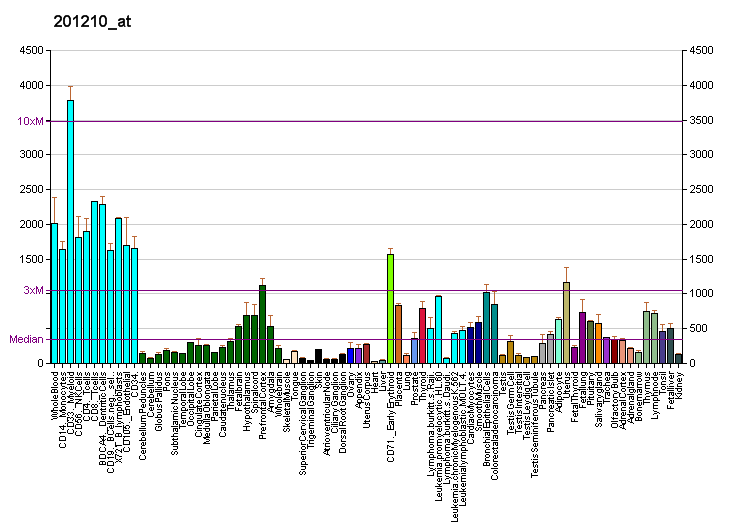

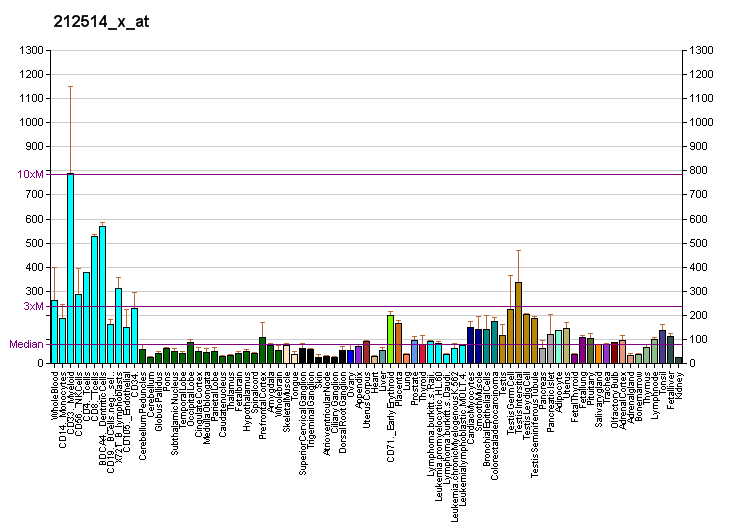

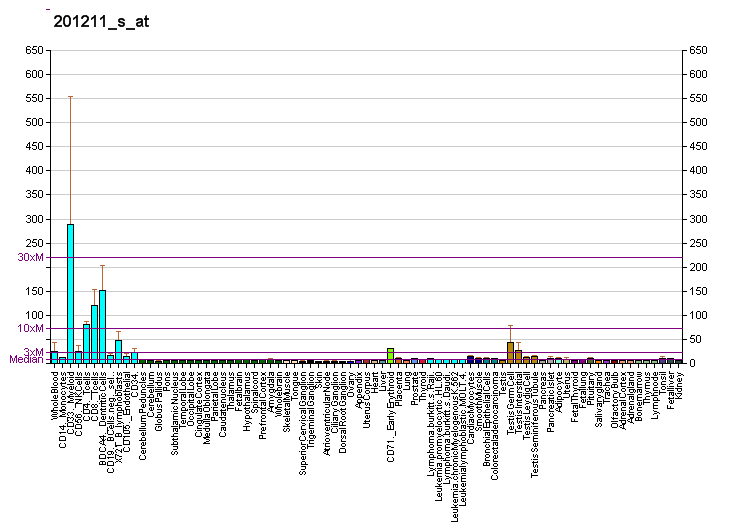
RNA expression pattern
Bgee	Human / Mouse (ortholog); Top expressed in: Epithelium of choroid plexus; oocyte; sperm; secondary oocyte; palpebral conjunctiva; lactiferous duct; tibia; mucosa of paranasal sinus; skin of hip; epithelium of colon / Top expressed in: maxillary prominence; cumulus cell; human fetus; tail of embryo; mandibular prominence; primitive streak; lacrimal gland; genital tubercle; epithelium of stomach; ureter; More reference expression data
BioGPS	More reference expression data
Gene ontology
Molecular function	DNA binding; nucleotide binding; nucleoside-triphosphatase activity; CTPase activity; helicase activity; poly(A) binding; ribosomal small subunit binding; RNA stem-loop binding; DNA helicase activity; transcription factor binding; ATPase activity; protein binding; GTPase activity; eukaryotic initiation factor 4E binding; RNA binding; nucleic acid binding; mRNA 5'-UTR binding; translation initiation factor binding; hydrolase activity; ATP binding; RNA strand annealing activity; cadherin binding; protein serine/threonine kinase activator activity
Cellular component	cytoplasm; eukaryotic translation initiation factor 3 complex; nuclear speck; membrane; mitochondrial outer membrane; cytosolic small ribosomal subunit; mitochondrion; cytoplasmic stress granule; extracellular exosome; nucleus; extracellular region; cytosol; secretory granule lumen; ficolin-1-rich granule lumen; nucleolus
Biological process	stress granule assembly; apoptotic process; negative regulation of translation; negative regulation of cysteine-type endopeptidase activity involved in apoptotic process; intracellular signal transduction; regulation of transcription, DNA-templated; ribosome biogenesis; negative regulation of intrinsic apoptotic signaling pathway; immune system process; chromosome segregation; negative regulation of protein-containing complex assembly; response to virus; negative regulation of apoptotic process; Wnt signaling pathway; positive regulation of translation; protein localization to cytoplasmic stress granule; transcription, DNA-templated; cellular response to osmotic stress; positive regulation of G1/S transition of mitotic cell cycle; intrinsic apoptotic signaling pathway; positive regulation of cysteine-type endopeptidase activity involved in apoptotic process; positive regulation of cell growth; positive regulation of gene expression; mature ribosome assembly; cellular response to arsenic-containing substance; negative regulation of cell growth; positive regulation of chemokine (C-C motif) ligand 5 production; RNA secondary structure unwinding; positive regulation of apoptotic process; positive regulation of viral genome replication; viral process; innate immune response; positive regulation of translational initiation; regulation of translation; extrinsic apoptotic signaling pathway via death domain receptors; positive regulation of transcription by RNA polymerase II; positive regulation of interferon-beta production; DNA duplex unwinding; neutrophil degranulation; positive regulation of protein serine/threonine kinase activity; positive regulation of canonical Wnt signaling pathway; translational initiation
Sources:Amigo / QuickGO
Orthologs
Databases	NCBI: entry; OMA: entry
Species	Human	Mouse
Entrez	1654	13205
Ensembl	ENSG00000215301	ENSMUSG00000000787
UniProt	O00571	Q62167
RefSeq (mRNA)	NM_001193416; NM_001193417; NM_001356; NM_024005; NM_001363819	NM_010028; NM_008015
RefSeq (protein)	NP_001180345; NP_001180346; NP_001347; NP_001350748	NP_034158
Location (UCSC)	Chr X: 41.33 – 41.36 Mb	Chr X: 13.15 – 13.16 Mb
PubMed search
- Wikidata
View/Edit Human	View/Edit Mouse

ATP-dependent RNA helicase DDX3X is an enzyme that in humans is encoded by the DDX3X gene.

== Function ==
DEAD box proteins are putative RNA helicases characterized by the conserved motif Asp-Glu-Ala-Asp (DEAD). They are implicated in a number of cellular processes involving alteration of RNA secondary structure, such as translation initiation, nuclear and mitochondrial splicing, and ribosome and spliceosome assembly. Based on their distribution patterns, some members of this family are believed to be involved in embryogenesis, spermatogenesis, and cellular growth and division. This gene encodes a DEAD box protein, which interacts specifically with the hepatitis C virus core protein, resulting in a change in intracellular location. This gene has a homolog located in the nonrecombining region of the Y chromosome. The protein sequence is 91% identical between this gene and the Y-linked homolog.

DDX3X has been shown to play an important role in translation initiation by interacting with the ribosome complex and unwinding and resolving 5´ UTR, particularly those with a complex structure, ahead of ribosome scanning. This interaction with the translational machinery is mediated by amino-acids at position 38–44. A reporter for the function and activity of DDX3X in 5´ UTR processing, named helicase activity reporter for translation (HART), was used to uncover the structures that are unwound by DDX3X.

DDX3X attenuates RNA-RNA interactions within G3BP1-driven RNP granules. Destabilization of these granules frees mRNA transcripts that were sequestered in the granules, restoring their availability and translatability.

=== Sub-cellular trafficking ===
DDX3X performs its functions in the cell nucleus and cytoplasm, exiting the nucleus via the exportin-1/CRM1 nuclear export pathway. It was initially reported that the DDX3X helicase domain was necessary for this interaction. At the same time, the canonical features of the trafficking pathway, namely the presence of a nuclear export signal (NES) on DDX3X and Ran-GTP binding to exportin-1, were dispensable. DDX3X binding to, and trafficking by, exportin-1 has since been shown not to require the DDX3X helicase domain and be explicitly NES- and Ran-GTP-dependent.

== Role in cancer ==
DDX3X is involved in many different types of cancer. For example, it is abnormally expressed in breast epithelial cancer cells in which HIF1A activates its expression during hypoxia. Increased expression of DDX3X by HIF1A in hypoxia is initiated by the direct binding of HIF1A to the HIF1A response element, as verified with chromatin immunoprecipitation and luciferase reporter assay. Since the expression of DDX3X is affected by the activity of HIF1A, the co-localization of these proteins has also been demonstrated in MDA-MB-231 xenograft tumor samples.

In HeLa cells, DDX3X is reported to control cell cycle progression through Cyclin E1. More specifically, DDX3X was shown to directly bind to the 5´ UTR of Cyclin E1, thereby facilitating the protein's translation. Increased protein levels of Cyclin E1 were demonstrated to mediate the transition of S phase entry.

Melanoma survival, migration, and proliferation are affected by DDX3X activity. Melanoma cells with low DDX3X expression exhibit a high migratory capacity, low proliferation rate, and reduced vemurafenib sensitivity. At the same time, high DDX3X-expressing cells are drug-sensitive, more proliferative, and less migratory. The translational effects on the melanoma transcription factor MITF can explain these phenotypes. The 5' UTR of the MITF mRNA contains a complex RNA regulon (IRES) that is bound and activated by DDX3X. Activation of the IRES leads to translation of the MITF mRNA. Mice injected with melanoma cells with a deleted IRES display more aggressive tumor progression, including increased lung metastasis. Interestingly, the DDX3X in melanoma is affected by vemurafenib via an undiscovered mechanism. It is unknown how the presence of vemurafenib downregulates DDX3X. However, reduced levels of DDX3X during drug treatment explain the development of drug-resistant cells frequently detected with low MITF expression.

== Clinical significance ==
Mutations of the DDX3X gene are associated with medulloblastoma. In melanoma, the low expression of the gene is linked to poor distant metastasis-free survival. In addition, the mRNA level of DDX3X is lower in matched post-relapse melanoma biopsies for patients receiving vemurafenib and in progressing tumors.

Mutations of the DDX3X gene also cause DDX3X syndrome, which affects predominantly females and presents with developmental delay or disability, autism, ADHD, and low muscle tone.

== See also ==
- Eukaryotic translation
- DExD/H box proteins
- DHX29
- DHX30
