= FASTKD2 =

Protein-coding gene in the species Homo sapiens

Identifiers
- Aliases: FASTKD2, KIAA0971, FAST kinase domains 2, COXPD44
- External IDs: OMIM: 612322; MGI: 1922869; GeneCards: FASTKD2

Gene location (Human)
Chr.	Chromosome 2 (human)
Band	2q33.3	Start	206,765,357 bp
Band	2q33.3	End	206,796,189 bp

Gene location (Mouse)
Chr.	Chromosome 1 (mouse)
Band	1|1 C2	Start	63,769,773 bp
Band	1|1 C2	End	63,793,814 bp
RNA expression pattern
Bgee	Human / Mouse (ortholog); Top expressed in: secondary oocyte; gastrocnemius muscle; biceps brachii; Skeletal muscle tissue of biceps brachii; gonad; Achilles tendon; muscle of thigh; left ventricle; right ventricle; islet of Langerhans / Top expressed in: Paneth cell; motor neuron; facial motor nucleus; soleus muscle; intercostal muscle; substantia nigra; fossa; cumulus cell; condyle; otic placode; More reference expression data
BioGPS	n/a
Gene ontology
Molecular function	protein kinase activity; rRNA binding; RNA binding
Cellular component	ribonucleoprotein granule; mitochondrial nucleoid; mitochondrion; nucleus; intercellular bridge
Biological process	cellular respiration; protein phosphorylation; ribosome biogenesis; mitochondrial large ribosomal subunit assembly; positive regulation of mitochondrial translation
Sources:Amigo / QuickGO
Orthologs
Databases	NCBI: entry; OMA: entry
Species	Human	Mouse
Entrez	22868	75619
Ensembl	ENSG00000118246	ENSMUSG00000025962
UniProt	Q9NYY8	Q922E6
RefSeq (mRNA)	NM_014929; NM_001136193; NM_001136194	NM_172422
RefSeq (protein)	NP_001129665; NP_001129666; NP_055744	NP_766010
Location (UCSC)	Chr 2: 206.77 – 206.8 Mb	Chr 1: 63.77 – 63.79 Mb
PubMed search
- Wikidata
View/Edit Human	View/Edit Mouse

FAST kinase domain-containing protein 2 (FASTKD2) is a protein that in humans is encoded by the FASTKD2 gene on chromosome 2. This protein is part of the FASTKD family, which is known for regulating the energy balance of mitochondria under stress. FASTKD2 has been implicated in mitochondrial encephalomyopathy, breast cancer, and prostate cancer.

== Structure ==
FASTKD2 shares structural characteristics of the FASTKD family, including a ~50-amino acid N-terminal mitochondrial targeting domain and three C-terminal domains: two FAST kinase-like domains (FAST_1 and FAST_2) and a RNA-binding domain (RAP). The mitochondrial targeting domain directs FASTKD2 to be imported into the mitochondria. Though the functions of the C-terminal domains are unknown, RAP possibly binds RNA during trans-splicing.

== Function ==
As a member of the FASTKD family, FASTKD2 localizes to the inner mitochondrial membrane to modulate their energy balance, especially under conditions of stress. Though ubiquitously expressed in all tissues, FASTKD2 appears more abundantly in skeletal muscle, heart muscle, and other tissues enriched in mitochondria. Nonetheless, FASTKD2 has been observed to mediate apoptosis independent of import into the mitochondria, suggesting that it interacts with proteins on the outer mitochondrial membrane. This protein possibly contributes its proapoptotic function through a caspase-dependent pathway, by activating proapoptotic factors or inhibiting antiapoptotic factors, but the exact mechanism remain unclear. FASTKD2 has also been validated as an RNA-binding protein.

== Clinical significance ==
FASTKD2 is an important apoptotic constituent. During a normal embryologic processes, or during cell injury (such as ischemia-reperfusion injury during heart attacks and strokes) or during developments and processes in cancer, an apoptotic cell undergoes structural changes including cell shrinkage, plasma membrane blebbing, nuclear condensation, and fragmentation of the DNA and nucleus. This is followed by fragmentation into apoptotic bodies that are quickly removed by phagocytes, thereby preventing an inflammatory response. It is a mode of cell death defined by characteristic morphological, biochemical and molecular changes. It was first described as a "shrinkage necrosis", and then this term was replaced by apoptosis to emphasize its role opposite mitosis in tissue kinetics. In later stages of apoptosis the entire cell becomes fragmented, forming a number of plasma membrane-bounded apoptotic bodies which contain nuclear and or cytoplasmic elements. The ultrastructural appearance of necrosis is quite different, the main features being mitochondrial swelling, plasma membrane breakdown and cellular disintegration. Apoptosis occurs in many physiological and pathological processes. It plays an important role during embryonal development as programmed cell death and accompanies a variety of normal involutional processes in which it serves as a mechanism to remove "unwanted" cells.

FASTKD2 has been linked to mitochondrial encephalomyopathy associated with cytochrome c oxidase deficiency (mitochondrial complex IV deficiency). Nonsense mutations in FASTKD2 produce a truncated protein that cuts off the RAP domain and part of the FAST domains, leading to dampened sensitivity to apoptotic stimuli. Moreover, breast cancer cells are protected against apoptosis by stimulating NRIF3/DD1 expression or DIF-1 knockdown, which thus suppresses the proapoptotic function of FASTKD2. The proapoptotic function is similarly observed in prostate cancer cells, but not in other cells; it is suggested that susceptibility to FASTKD2-mediated apoptosis requires certain factors to associate with the DIF-1 complex to bind. Thus far, activating and enhancing expression of FASTKD2 may prove effective in killing breast and prostate cancer cells.

== Interactions ==
FASTKD2 has been shown to interact with FASTKD3. The FASTKD2 gene has been observed to bind the DIF-1 complex.
