= DEAD box =

Family of proteins

DEAD/DEAH box helicase
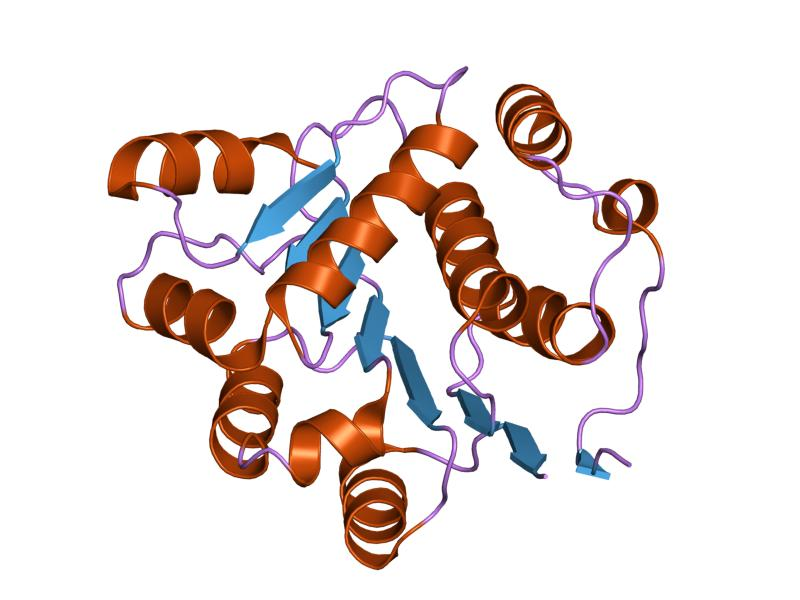
- Structure of the amino terminal domain of yeast initiation factor 4A. PDB 1qva

Identifiers
- Symbol: DEAD
- Pfam: PF00270
- Pfam clan: CL0023
- InterPro: IPR011545
- PROSITE: PDOC00039
- SCOP2: 1qva / SCOPe / SUPFAM
- CDD: cd00268
Available protein structures:
- PDB: IPR011545 PF00270 (ECOD; PDBsum)
- AlphaFold: IPR011545; PF00270

DEAD box proteins are involved in an assortment of metabolic processes that typically involve RNAs, but in some cases also other nucleic acids. They are highly conserved in nine motifs and can be found in most prokaryotes and eukaryotes, but not all. Many organisms, including humans, contain DEAD-box (SF2) helicases, which are involved in RNA metabolism.

== DEAD box family ==
DEAD box proteins were first brought to attention in the late 1980s in a study that looked at a group of NTP binding sites that were similar in sequence to the eIF4A RNA helicase sequence. The results of this study showed that these proteins (p68, SrmB, MSS116, vasa, PL10, mammalian eIF4A, yeast eIF4A) involved in RNA metabolism had several common elements. There were nine common sequences found to be conserved amongst the studied species, which is an important criterion of the DEAD box family.

The nine conserved motif from the N-terminal to the C-terminal are named as follows: Q-motif, motif 1, motif 1a, motif 1b, motif II, motif III, motif IV, motif V, and motif VI, as shown in the figure. Motif II is also known as the Walker B motif and contains the amino acid sequence D-E-A-D (asp-glu-ala-asp), which gave this family of proteins the name “DEAD box”. Motif 1, motif II, the Q motif, and motif VI are all needed for ATP binding and hydrolysis, while motifs, 1a, 1b, III, IV, and V may be involved in intramolecular rearrangements and RNA interaction.

== Related families ==
The DEAH and SKI2 families have had proteins that have been identified to be related to the DEAD box family. These two relatives have a few particularly unique motifs that are conserved within their own family.

DEAD box, DEAH, and the SKI2 families are collectively referred to as DExD/H proteins. It is thought that each family has a specific role in RNA metabolism, for example both DEAD box and DEAH box proteins NTPase activities become stimulated by RNA, but DEAD box proteins use ATP and DEAH does not.

== Biological functions ==
DEAD box proteins are considered to be RNA helicases and many have been found to be required in cellular processes such as RNA metabolism, including nuclear transcription, pre-mRNA splicing, ribosome biogenesis, nucleocytoplasmic transport, translation, RNA decay and organellar gene expression.

=== Pre-mRNA splicing ===
Pre-mRNA splicing requires rearrangements of five large RNP complexes, which are snRNPs U1, U2, U4, U5, and U6. DEAD box proteins are helicases that perform unwinding in an energy-dependent approach and are able to perform these snRNP rearrangements in a quick and efficient manner. There are three DEAD box proteins in the yeast system, Sub2, Prp28, and Prp5, which have been proven to be required for in vivo splicing. Prp5 has been shown to assist in a conformational rearrangement of U2 snRNA, which makes the branch point–recognition sequence of U2 available to bind the branch point sequence. Prp28 may have a role in recognizing the 5’ splice site and does not display RNA helicase activity, suggesting that other factors must be present in order to activate Prp28. DExD/H proteins have also been found to be required components in pre- mRNA splicing, in particular the DEAH proteins, Prp2, Prp16, Prp22, Prp43, and Brr213. As shown in the figure, DEAD box proteins are needed in the initial steps of spliceosome formation, while DEAH box proteins are indirectly required for the transesterifications, release of the mRNA, and recycling of the spliceosome complex9.

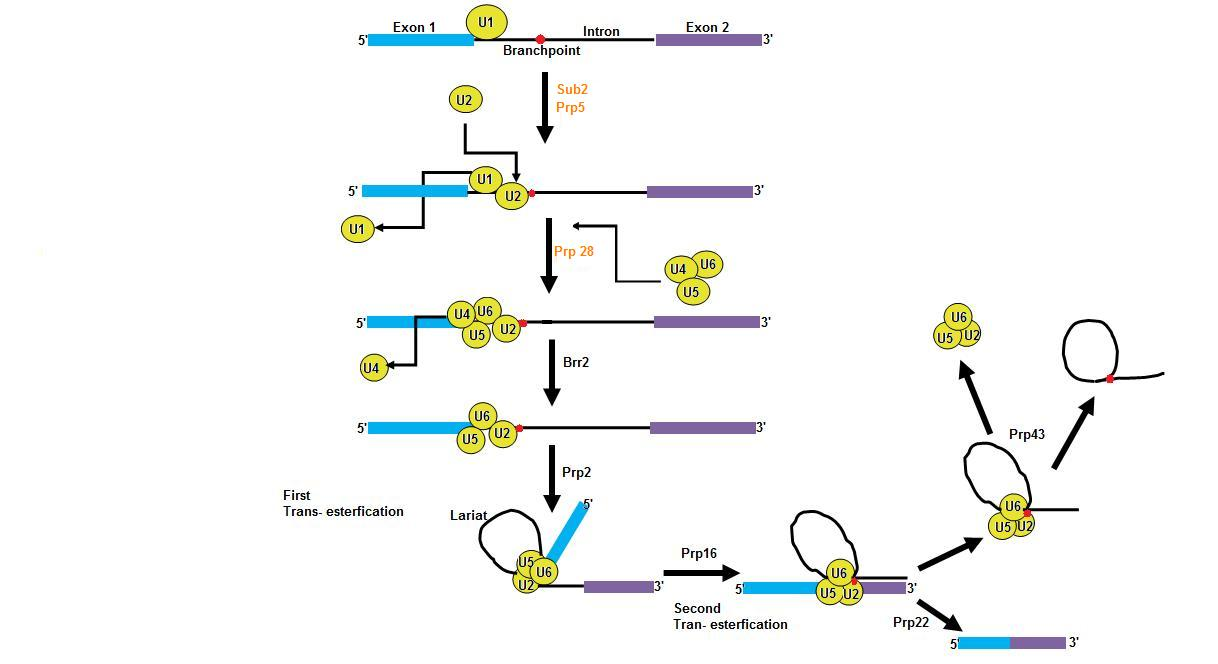
The role of DEAD box proteins in pre-mRNA splicing. The orange text represents the DEAD box proteins.

=== Translation initiation ===
The eIF4A translation initiation factor was the first DEAD box protein found to have an RNA-dependent ATPase activity. It has been proposed that this abundant protein helps in unwinding the secondary structure in the 5'-untranslated region. This can inhibit the scanning process of the small ribosomal subunit, if not unwound. Ded1 is another DEAD box protein that is also needed for translation initiation, but its exact role in this process is still obscure. Vasa, a DEAD box protein highly related to Ded1 plays a part in translation initiation by interacting with eukaryotic initiation factor 2 (eIF2).

== See also ==
- DDX3X
- RNA helicase
- Walker A motif
