= Bacterial translation =

Protein synthesis process in bacteria

Gene expression involves the transcription of mRNA from DNA and then its translation at the ribosome. Unlike eukaryotes, prokaryotes don't have a nucleus, which allows the ribosome to connect to one end of the mRNA while the other continues transcription. Key: 1 - RNA polymerase, 2 - Cytoplasm, 3 - Cell Membrane, 4 - DNA, 5 - Ribosome, 6 - Amino acid, 7 - Polypeptide chain, 8 - mRNA

Bacterial translation is the process by which messenger RNA is translated into proteins in bacteria.

== Initiation ==
Initiation of translation in bacteria involves the assembly of the components of the translation system, which are: the two ribosomal subunits (50S and 30S subunits); the mature mRNA to be translated; the tRNA charged with N-formylmethionine (the first amino acid in the nascent peptide); guanosine triphosphate (GTP) as a source of energy, and the three bacterial initiation factors IF1, IF2, and IF3, which help the assembly of the initiation complex. Variations in the mechanism can be anticipated.

The ribosome has three active sites: the A site, the P site, and the E site. The A site is the point of entry for the aminoacyl tRNA (except for the first aminoacyl tRNA, which enters at the P site). The P site is where the peptidyl tRNA is formed in the ribosome. And the E site which is the exit site of the now uncharged tRNA after it gives its amino acid to the growing peptide chain.

=== Canonical initiation: Shine-Dalgarno sequence ===
The majority of mRNAs in E. coli are prefaced with a Shine-Dalgarno (SD) sequence. The SD sequence is recognized by an complementary "anti-SD" region on the 16S rRNA component of the 30S subunit. In the canonical model, the 30S ribosome is first joined up with the three initiation factors, forming an unstable "pre-initiation complex". The mRNA then pairs up with this anti-SD region, causing it to form a double-stranded RNA structure, roughly positioning the start codon at the P site. An initiating tRNA^{fMet} arrives and is positioned with the help of IF2, starting the translation.

There are a lot of uncertainties even in the canonical model. The initiation site has been shown to be not strictly limited to AUG. Well-known coding regions that do not have AUG initiation codons are those of lacI (GUG) and lacA (UUG) in the E. coli lac operon. Two studies have independently shown that 17 or more non-AUG start codons may initiate translation in E. coli. Nevertheless, AUG seems to at least be the strongest initiation codon among all possibilities.

The SD sequence also does not appear strictly necessary, as a wide range of mRNAs lack them and are still translated, with an entire phylum of bacteria (Bacteroidetes) using no such sequence. Simply SD followed by AUG is also not sufficient to initiate translation. It does, at least, function as a very important initiating signal in E. coli.

=== 70S scanning model ===
When translating a polycistronic mRNA, a 70S ribosome ends translation at a stop codon. It is now shown that instead of immediately splitting into its two halves, the ribosome can "scan" forward until it hits another Shine–Dalgarno sequence and the downstream initiation codon, initiating another translation with the help of IF2 and IF3. This mode is thought to be important for the translation of genes that are clustered in poly-cistronic operons, where the canonical binding mode can be disruptive due to small distances between neighboring genes on the same mRNA molecule.

=== Leaderless initiation ===
A number of bacterial mRNAs have no 5'UTR whatsoever, or a very short one. The complete 70S ribosome, with the help of IF2 (recruiting fMet-tRNA), can simply start translating such a "leaderless" mRNA.

A number of factors modify the efficiency of leaderless initiation. A 5' phosphate group attached to the start codon seems near-essential. AUG is strongly preferred in E. coli, but not necessarily in other species. IF3 inhibits leaderless initiation. A longer 5'UTR or one with significant secondary structure also inhibits leaderless initiation.

== Elongation ==
Elongation of the polypeptide chain involves addition of amino acids to the carboxyl end of the growing chain. The growing protein exits the ribosome through the polypeptide exit tunnel in the large subunit.

Elongation starts when the fMet-tRNA enters the P site, causing a conformational change which opens the A site for the new aminoacyl-tRNA to bind. This binding is facilitated by elongation factor-Tu (EF-Tu), a small GTPase. For fast and accurate recognition of the appropriate tRNA, the ribosome utilizes large conformational changes (conformational proofreading). Now the P site contains the beginning of the peptide chain of the protein to be encoded and the A site has the next amino acid to be added to the peptide chain. The growing polypeptide connected to the tRNA in the P site is detached from the tRNA in the P site and a peptide bond is formed between the last amino acids of the polypeptide and the amino acid still attached to the tRNA in the A site. This process, known as peptide bond formation, is catalyzed by a ribozyme (the 23S ribosomal RNA in the 50S ribosomal subunit). Now, the A site has the newly formed peptide, while the P site has an uncharged tRNA (tRNA with no amino acids). The newly formed peptide in the A site tRNA is known as dipeptide and the whole assembly is called dipeptidyl-tRNA. The tRNA in the P site minus the amino acid is known to be deacylated. In the final stage of elongation, called translocation, the deacylated tRNA (in the P site) and the dipeptidyl-tRNA (in the A site) along with its corresponding codons move to the E and P sites, respectively, and a new codon moves into the A site. This process is catalyzed by elongation factor G (EF-G). The deacylated tRNA at the E site is released from the ribosome during the next A-site occupation by an aminoacyl-tRNA again facilitated by EF-Tu.

The ribosome continues to translate the remaining codons on the mRNA as more aminoacyl-tRNA bind to the A site, until the ribosome reaches a stop codon on mRNA(UAA, UGA, or UAG).

The translation machinery works relatively slowly compared to the enzyme systems that catalyze DNA replication. Proteins in bacteria are synthesized at a rate of only 18 amino acid residues per second, whereas bacterial replisomes synthesize DNA at a rate of 1000 nucleotides per second. This difference in rate reflects, in part, the difference between polymerizing four types of nucleotides to make nucleic acids and polymerizing 20 types of amino acids to make proteins.

Testing and rejecting incorrect aminoacyl-tRNA molecules takes time and slows protein synthesis. In bacteria, translation initiation occurs as soon as the 5' end of an mRNA is synthesized, and translation and transcription are coupled. This is not possible in eukaryotes because transcription and translation are carried out in separate compartments of the cell (the nucleus and cytoplasm).

== Termination ==
Termination occurs when one of the three termination codons moves into the A site. These codons are not recognized by any tRNAs. Instead, they are recognized by proteins called release factors, namely RF1 (recognizing the UAA and UAG stop codons) or RF2 (recognizing the UAA and UGA stop codons). These factors trigger the hydrolysis of the ester bond in peptidyl-tRNA and the release of the newly synthesized protein from the ribosome. A third release factor RF-3 catalyzes the release of RF-1 and RF-2 at the end of the termination process.

== Recycling ==
The post-termination complex formed by the end of the termination step consists of mRNA with the termination codon at the A-site, an uncharged tRNA in the P site, and the intact 70S ribosome. Ribosome recycling step is responsible for the disassembly of the post-termination ribosomal complex. Once the nascent protein is released in termination, Ribosome Recycling Factor and Elongation Factor G (EF-G) function to release mRNA and tRNAs from ribosomes and dissociate the 70S ribosome into the 30S and 50S subunits. IF3 then replaces the deacylated tRNA releasing the mRNA. All translational components are now free for additional rounds of translation.

Depending on the tRNA, IF1–IF3 may also perform recycling.

== Polysomes ==
Translation is carried out by more than one ribosome simultaneously. Because of the relatively large size of ribosomes, they can only attach to sites on mRNA 35 nucleotides apart. The complex of one mRNA and a number of ribosomes is called a polysome or polyribosome.

== Regulation of translation ==
When bacterial cells run out of nutrients, they enter stationary phase and downregulate protein synthesis. Several processes mediate this transition. For instance, in E. coli, 70S ribosomes form 90S dimers upon binding with a small 6.5 kDa protein, ribosome modulation factor RMF. These intermediate ribosome dimers can subsequently bind a hibernation promotion factor (the 10.8 kDa protein, HPF) molecule to form a mature 100S ribosomal particle, in which the dimerization interface is made by the two 30S subunits of the two participating ribosomes. The ribosome dimers represent a hibernation state and are translationally inactive. A third protein that can bind to ribosomes when E. coli cells enter the stationary phase is YfiA (previously known as RaiA). HPF and YfiA are structurally similar, and both proteins can bind to the catalytic A- and P-sites of the ribosome. RMF blocks ribosome binding to mRNA by preventing interaction of the messenger with 16S rRNA. When bound to the ribosomes the C-terminal tail of E. coli YfiA interferes with the binding of RMF, thus preventing dimerization and resulting in the formation of translationally inactive monomeric 70S ribosomes.

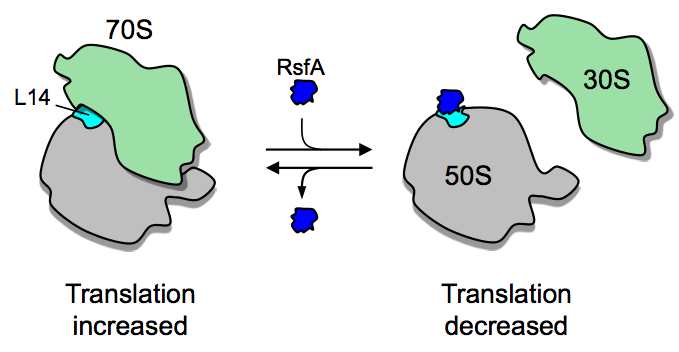
Mechanism of ribosomal subunit dissociation by RsfS (= RsfA). RsfS inactivates translation when cells starve ("S") and thus are short on amino acids.

In addition to ribosome dimerization, the joining of the two ribosomal subunits can be blocked by RsfS (formerly called RsfA or YbeB). RsfS binds to L14, a protein of the large ribosomal subunit, and thereby blocks joining of the small subunit to form a functional 70S ribosome, slowing down or blocking translation entirely. RsfS proteins are found in almost all eubacteria (but not archaea) and homologs are present in mitochondria and chloroplasts (where they are called MALSU1 and iojap, respectively). However, it is not known yet how the expression or activity of RsfS is regulated.

Another ribosome-dissociation factor in Escherichia coli is HflX, previously a GTPase of unknown function. Zhang et al. (2015) showed that HflX is a heat shock–induced ribosome-splitting factor capable of dissociating vacant as well as mRNA-associated ribosomes. The N-terminal effector domain of HflX binds to the peptidyl transferase center in a strikingly similar manner as that of the class I release factors and induces dramatic conformational changes in central intersubunit bridges, thus promoting subunit dissociation. Accordingly, loss of HflX results in an increase in stalled ribosomes upon heat shock and possibly other stress conditions.

== Effect of antibiotics ==
Several antibiotics exert their action by targeting the translation process in bacteria. They exploit the differences between bacterial and eukaryotic translation mechanisms to selectively inhibit protein synthesis in bacteria without affecting the host.

== See also ==
- Bacterial initiation factors
- Elongation factors
- Bacterial, archaeal and plant plastid code
