= Archaeal initiation factors =

Protein synthesis in prokaryotes

Archaeal initiation factors are proteins that are used during the translation step of protein synthesis in archaea. The principal functions these proteins perform include ribosome RNA/mRNA recognition, delivery of the initiator Met-tRNA_{i}^{Met}, methionine bound tRNAi, to the 40s ribosome, and proofreading of the initiation complex.

== Conservation of archaeal initiation factors ==
Of the three domains of life, archaea, eukaryotes, and bacteria, the number of archaeal TIFs is somewhere between eukaryotes and bacteria; eukaryotes have the largest number of TIFs, and bacteria, having streamlined the process, have only three TIFs. Not only are archaeal TIF numbers between that of bacteria and eukaryote numbers, but archaeal initiation factors are seen to have both traits of eukaryotic and prokaryotic initiation factors. Two core TIFs, IF1/IF1A and IF2/IF5B are conserved across the three domains of life. There is also a semi-universal TIF found in all archaea and eukaryote called SUI1, but only in certain bacterial species (YciH). In archaea and eukaryotes, these TIFs help correct the identification of the initiation codon, while its function is unknown in bacteria. Just between eukaryote and archaea, a/eIF2 (trimer) and aIF6 in archaea are conserved in eukaryotes as eIF2 (trimer) and eIF6 TIFs.

Archaea may also carry homologs of eukaryotic eIF2B (the GTP-exchange factor for eIF2). However, only the α subunit is definitively identified, so it probably does not act as a GTP-exchange factor in archaea. There is also a homolog of eIF4A, but it does not seem to participate in translation initiation.

== List of initiation factors ==
- aIF1: SUI1 (eIF1) homolog.
- aIF1A: IF1/eIF1A homolog. Plays a role in occupying the ribosomal A site, helping the unambiguous placement of tRNAi in the P site of in the large ribosomal subunit.
- aIF2: Trimeric, eIF2 homolog. Binds to the 40S small subunit of the ribosome to help guide the start translation of mRNA into proteins. Can substitute for eIF2.
- aIF5A: EF-P/eIF5A homolog. Contains hypusine, just like the eukaryotic one. Actually an elongation factor.
- aIF5B: IF2/eIF5B homolog. Join the ribosomal subunits (small and large) to form the complete single (monomeric) mRNA bound ribosome unit in the late stages of initiation.
- aIF6: eIF6 homolog. Keeps the two ribosomal subunits apart.
