= Initiation factor =

Protein which binds to a ribosome during translation

In molecular biology, initiation factors are proteins that bind to the small subunit of the ribosome during the initiation of translation, a part of protein biosynthesis.

Initiation factors can interact with repressors to slow down or prevent translation. They have the ability to interact with activators to help them start or increase the rate of translation. In bacteria, they are simply called IFs (i.e.., IF1, IF2, & IF3) and in eukaryotes they are known as eIFs (i.e.., eIF1, eIF2, eIF3). Translation initiation is sometimes described as three step process which initiation factors help to carry out. First, the tRNA carrying a methionine amino acid binds to the small subunit of ribosome, then binds to the mRNA, and finally joins together with the large subunit of ribosome. The initiation factors that help with this process each have different roles and structures.

== Types ==
The initiation factors are divided into three major groups by taxonomic domains. There are some homologies shared (click the domain names to see the domain-specific factors):

InterPro	Bacterial	Archaeal	Eukaryotic	Common function
IPR006196	IF-1	aIF1A	eIF1A	diverse across domains
IPR015760	IF-2	aIF5B	eIF5B	diverse across domains
IPR001950 (SUI1)	YciH?	aIF1	eIF1	mRNA binding, fidelity of start codon
IPR001288	IF-3	—	—	fidelity of start codon
IPR001884	EF-P	aIF5A	eIF5A	an elongation factor
(three subunits)	—	aIF2	eIF2	binds tRNA_{i}^{Met}
IPR002769	—	aIF6	eIF6	keeps two ribosomal subunits disassociated by binding large subunit

== Structure and function ==
Many structural domains have been conserved through evolution, as prokaryotic initiation factors share similar structures with eukaryotic factors. The prokaryotic initiation factor, IF3, assists with start site specificity, as well as mRNA binding. This is in comparison with the eukaryotic initiation factor, eIF1, who also performs these functions. The elF1 structure is similar to the C-terminal domain of IF3, as they each contain a five-stranded beta sheet against two alpha helices.

The prokaryotic initiation factors IF1 and IF2 are also homologs of the eukaryotic initiation factors eIF1A and eIF5B. IF1 and eIF1A, both containing an OB-fold, bind to the A site and assist in the assembly of initiation complexes at the start codon. IF2 and eIF5B assist in the joining of the small and large ribosomal subunits. The eIF5B factor also contains elongation factors. Domain IV of eIF5B is closely related to the C-terminal domain of IF2, as they both consist of a beta-barrel. The elF5B also contains a GTP-binding domain, which can switch from an active GTP to an inactive GDP. This switch helps to regulate the affinity of the ribosome for the initiation factor.

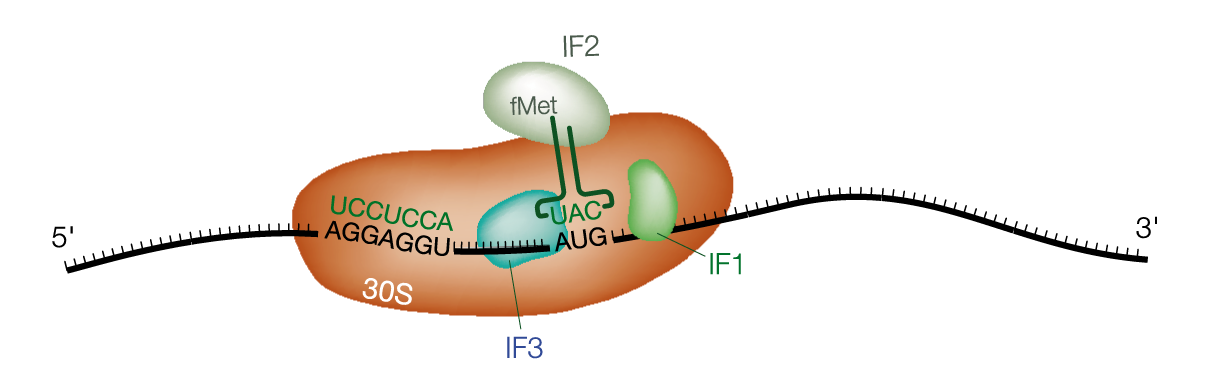
The bacterial 30S initiation complex, also showing the Shine-Dalgarno sequence upstream of the start codon

A eukaryotic initiation factor eIF3 plays an important role in translational initiation. It has a complex structure, composed of 13 subunits. It helps to create the 43S pre-initiation complex, composed of the small 40S subunit attached to other initiation factors. It also helps to create the 48S pre-initiation complex, consisting of the 43S complex with the mRNA. The eIF3 factor can also be used post-translation in order to separate the ribosomal complex and keep the small and large subunits apart. The initiation factor interacts with the eIF1 and eIF5 factors used for scanning and selection of the start codons. This can create changes in the selection of the factors, binding to different codons.

Another important eukaryotic initiation factor, eIF2, binds the tRNA containing methionine to the P site of the small ribosome. The P site is where the tRNA carrying an amino acid forms a peptide bond with the incoming amino acids and carries the peptide chain. The factor consists of an alpha, beta, and gamma subunit. The eIF2 gamma subunit is characterized by a GTP-binding domain and beta-barrel folds. It binds to the tRNA through GTP. Once the initiation factor helps the tRNA bind, the GTP hydrolyzes and is released the eIF2. The eIF2 beta subunit is identified by its Zn-finger. The eIF2 alpha subunit is characterized by an OB-fold domain and two beta strands. This subunit helps to regulate translation, as it becomes phosphorylated to inhibit protein synthesis.

The eIF4F complex supports the cap-dependent translation initiation process and is composed of the initiation factors eIF4A, eIF4E, and eIF4G. The cap end of the mRNA, being the 5’ end, is brought to the complex where the 43S ribosomal complex can bind and scan the mRNA for the start codon. During this process, the 60S ribosomal subunit binds and the large 80S ribosomal complex is formed. The eIF4G plays a role, as it interacts with the polyA-binding protein, attracting the mRNA. The eIF4E then binds the cap of the mRNA and the small ribosomal subunit binds to the eIF4G to begin the process of creating the 80S ribosomal complex. The eIF4A works to make this process more successful, as it is a DEAD box helicase. It allows for the unwinding of the untranslated regions of the mRNA to allow for ribosomal binding and scanning.

== In cancer ==
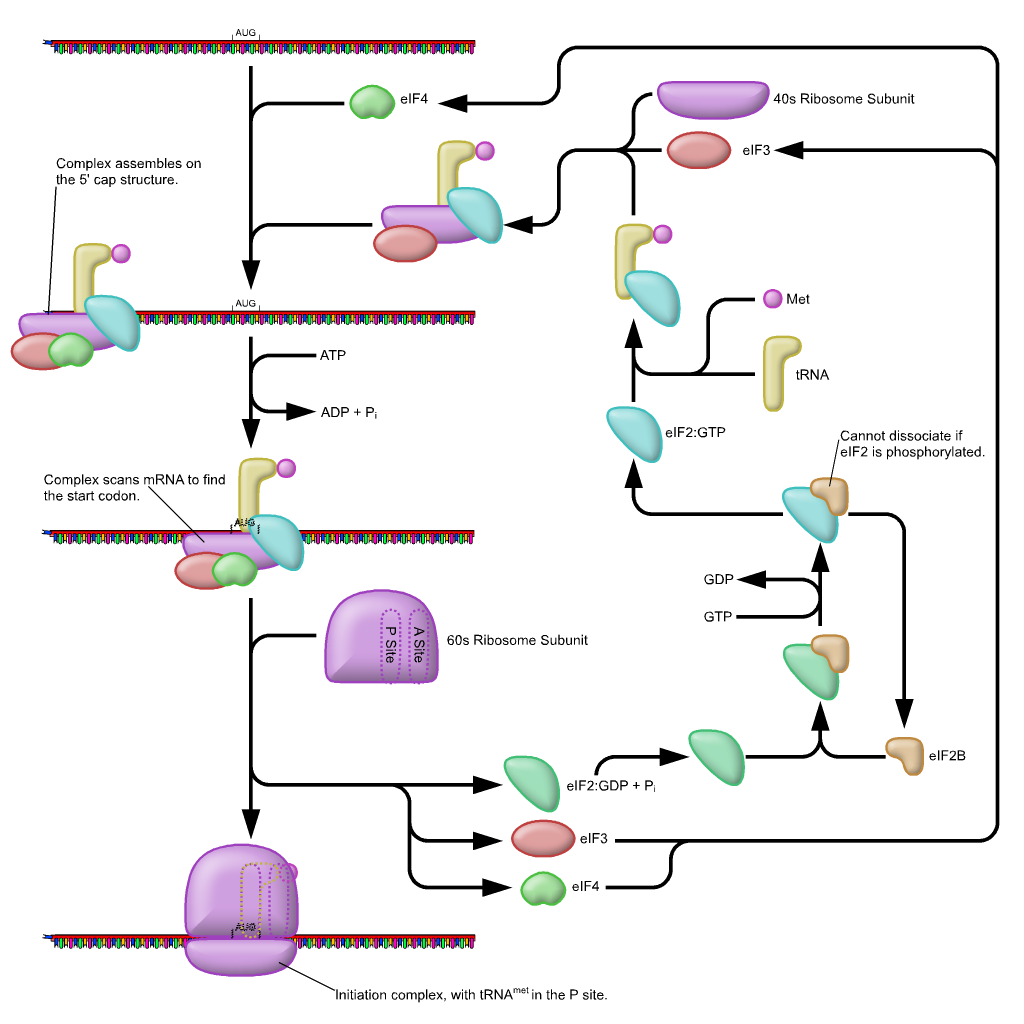
The formation of the eukaryotic initiation complex

In cancerous cells, initiation factors assist in cellular transformation and development of tumors. The survival and growth of cancer is directly related to the modification of initiation factors and is used as a target for pharmaceuticals. Cells need increased energy when cancerous and derive this energy from proteins. Over-expression of initiation factors correlates with cancers, as they increase protein synthesis for proteins needed in cancers. Some initiation factors, such as eIF4E, are important in synthesizing specific proteins needed for the proliferation and survival of cancer. The careful selection of proteins ensures that proteins that are usually limited in translation and only proteins needed for cancer cell growth will be synthesized. This includes proteins involved in growth, malignancy, and angiogenesis. The eIF4E factor, along with eIF4A and eIF4G, also play a role in transitioning benign cancer cells to metastatic.

The largest initiation factor, eIF3, is another significant initiation factor in human cancers. Due to its role in creating the 43S pre-initiation complex, it helps to bind the ribosomal subunit to the mRNA. The initiation factor has been linked to cancers through over-expression. For example, one of the thirteen eIF3 proteins, eIF3c, interacts with and represses proteins used in tumor suppression. Limited expression of certain eIF3 proteins, such as eIF3a an eIF3d, has been proven to decrease the vigorous growth of cancer cells. The over-expression of eIF3a has been linked to breast, lung, cervix, esophagus, stomach, and colon cancers. It is prevalent during early stages of oncogenesis and likely selectively translates proteins needed for cell proliferation. When eIF3a is suppressed, it has shown to decrease the malignancy of breast and lung cancer, most likely due to its role in tumor growth.

== See also ==
- Ribosome
- Eukaryotic translation
- Eukaryotic initiation factor
