= IF3 (disambiguation) =

IF3 or IF_{3} may refer to:

- IF3 International Freeski Film Festival
- Iodine trifluoride, IF_{3}
- PIF-3 or prokaryotic initiation factor 3
- Translation initiation factor IF-3
- IF3, a rating on the International Fujita scale
