= DHPS (disambiguation) =

DHPS is an acronym that can stand for:

== Sciences ==
- Deoxyhypusine synthase, DHPS
- Dihydropteroate synthetase

== Organisations ==
- Deutsche Höhere Privatschule Windhoek
