= DHPS =

Protein-coding gene in the species Homo sapiens

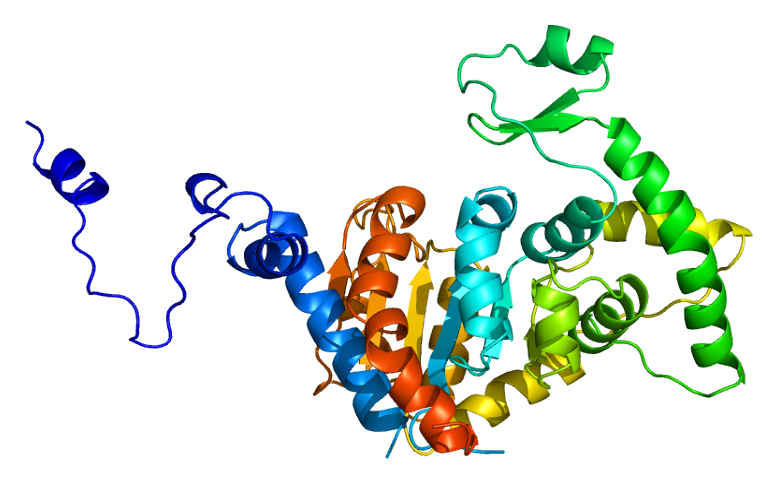
Available structures
PDB	Ortholog search: PDBe RCSB
PDB	List of PDB id codes 1DHS, 1RLZ, 1ROZ, 1RQD

Identifiers
- Aliases: DHPS, deoxyhypusine synthase, DHS, DS, MIG13, NEDSSWI
- External IDs: OMIM: 600944; MGI: 2683592; HomoloGene: 1453; GeneCards: DHPS; OMA:DHPS - orthologs
- EC number: 2.5.1.46

Gene location (Human)
Chr.	Chromosome 19 (human)
Band	19p13.13	Start	12,675,717 bp
Band	19p13.13	End	12,681,880 bp

Gene location (Mouse)
Chr.	Chromosome 8 (mouse)
Band	8|8 C3	Start	85,798,386 bp
Band	8|8 C3	End	85,801,791 bp
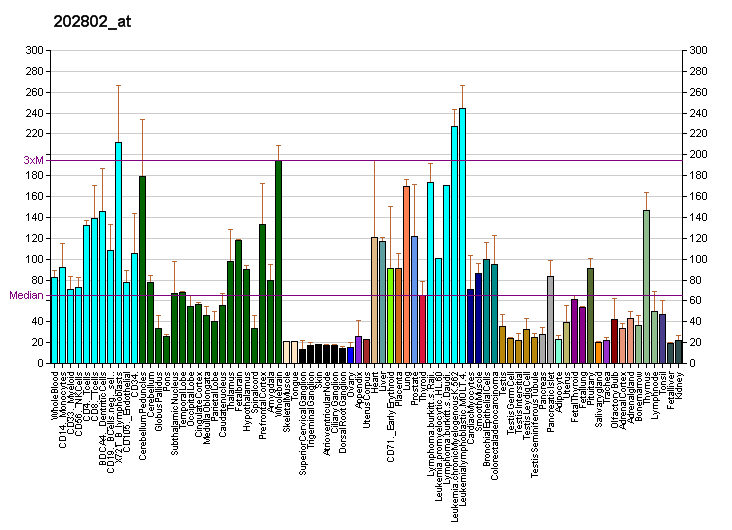

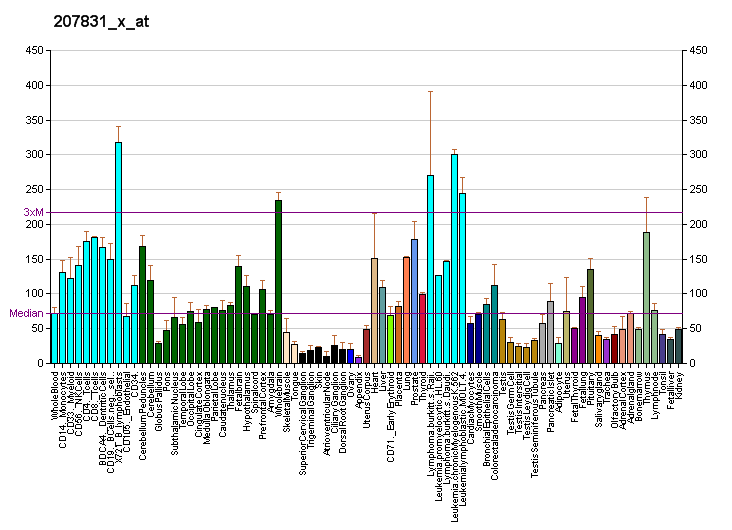

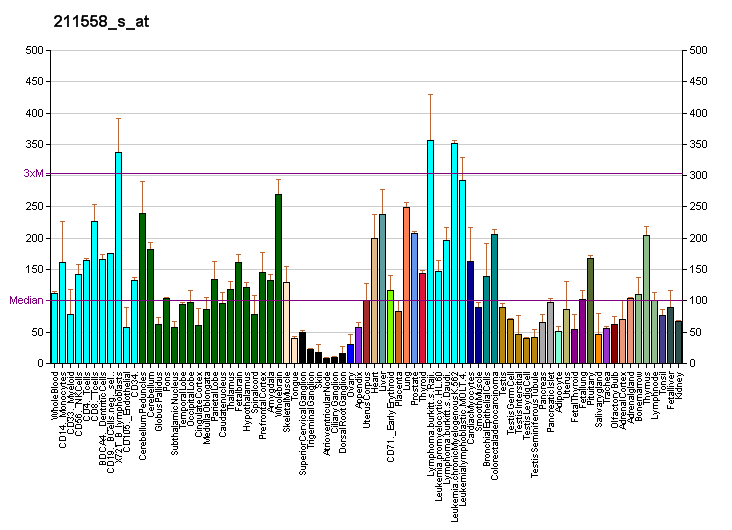
RNA expression pattern
Bgee	Human / Mouse (ortholog); Top expressed in: right hemisphere of cerebellum; ganglionic eminence; primary visual cortex; pituitary gland; anterior pituitary; right uterine tube; left ovary; prostate; muscle of thigh; prefrontal cortex / Top expressed in: embryo; embryo; superior frontal gyrus; neural layer of retina; aortic valve; muscle of thigh; ascending aorta; supraoptic nucleus; epiblast; morula; More reference expression data
BioGPS	More reference expression data
Gene ontology
Molecular function	transferase activity; protein binding; identical protein binding; deoxyhypusine synthase activity
Cellular component	cytosol; cytoplasm
Biological process	protein homotetramerization; protein biosynthesis; positive regulation of T cell proliferation; glucose homeostasis; positive regulation of cell population proliferation; spermidine metabolic process; spermidine catabolic process; peptidyl-lysine modification to peptidyl-hypusine
Sources:Amigo / QuickGO
Orthologs
Species	Human	Mouse
Entrez	1725	330817
Ensembl	ENSG00000095059	ENSMUSG00000060038
UniProt	P49366	Q3TXU5
RefSeq (mRNA)	NM_001206974; NM_001930; NM_013406; NM_001369691; NM_001369692 NM_001369693	NM_001039514; NM_201408
RefSeq (protein)	NP_001193903; NP_001921; NP_037538; NP_001356620; NP_001356621 NP_001356622	NP_001034603
Location (UCSC)	Chr 19: 12.68 – 12.68 Mb	Chr 8: 85.8 – 85.8 Mb
PubMed search
- Wikidata
View/Edit Human	View/Edit Mouse

Deoxyhypusine synthase is an enzyme that in humans is encoded by the DHPS gene.

The unusual amino acid hypusine is formed posttranslationally and is only found in a single cellular protein, eukaryotic translation initiation factor 5A (EIF5A, EIF5A2). In the first step of hypusine biosynthesis, deoxyhypusine synthase catalyzes the NAD-dependent transfer of the butylamine moiety of spermidine to the epsilon-amino group of a specific lysine residue of the EIF5A precursor protein to form the intermediate deoxyhypusine residue. This gene consists of nine exons spanning 6.6 kb. Three transcript variants have been isolated. However, only transcript variant 1 encodes an active protein. The shorter variants may act as modulating factors of DHPS activity.
