= DOHH =

DOHH may refer to:

- Deoxyhypusine hydroxylase
- Deaf or hard of hearing
