= Bacterial initiation factor =

Protein that stabilizes the initiation complex for polypeptide translation

A bacterial initiation factor (IF) is a protein that stabilizes the initiation complex for polypeptide translation.

Translation initiation is essential to protein synthesis and regulates mRNA translation fidelity and efficiency in bacteria. The 30S ribosomal subunit, initiator tRNA, and mRNA form an initiation complex for elongation. This complex process requires three essential protein factors in bacteria – IF1, IF2, and IF3. These factors bind to the 30S subunit and promote correct initiation codon selection on the mRNA. IF1, the smallest factor at 8.2 kDa, blocks elongator tRNA binding at the A-site. IF2 is the major component that transports initiator tRNA to the P-site. IF3 checks P-site codon-anticodon pairing and rejects incorrect initiation complexes.

The orderly mechanism of initiation starts with IF3 attaching to the 30S subunit and changing its shape. IF1 joins next, followed by mRNA binding, and starts codon-P-site interaction. IF2 enters with the initiator tRNA and places it on the start codon. GTP hydrolysis by IF2 releases it and IF3, enabling 50S subunit joining. The coordinated binding and activities of IF1, IF2, and IF3 are essential for the rapid and precise translation initiation in bacteria. They facilitate start codon selection and assemble an active, protein-synthesis-ready 70S ribosome.

== IF1 ==
Bacterial initiation factor 1 associates with the 30S ribosomal subunit in the A site and prevents an aminoacyl-tRNA from entering. It modulates IF2 binding to the ribosome by increasing its affinity. It may also prevent the 50S subunit from binding, stopping the formation of the 70S subunit. It also contains a β-domain fold common for nucleic acid-binding proteins. It is a homolog of eIF1A. Initiation factor IF-1 is the smallest translation factor at only 8.2kDa. Beyond blocking the A-site, it affects the dynamics of ribosome association and dissociation. IF-1 enhances dissociation with IF-3, likely by inducing conformational changes in the 30S subunit. It also increases the binding affinity of IF-2 to the 30S subunit, possibly by altering the subunit configuration. Though IF-1 occupies the A-site, it does so in a way that is distinct from tRNA binding. Structural studies show IF-1 inserts a loop into the minor groove of helix 44 of 16S rRNA, flipping out bases A1492 and A1493. This insertion repositions nucleotides of helix 44, transmitting a conformational change over a 70Å distance and rotating the head of the 30S subunit. IF-1 mutants can exhibit cold-sensitive phenotypes, indicating a role for the factor in cold shock adaptation. Certain mutations also lead to o of genes at low temperatures, suggesting IF-1 is involved in gene regulation. IF-1 actively modifies ribosome structure and dynamics during initiation, in addition to just blocking the A-site.

== IF2 ==
The IF2 initiation factor is a crucial component in the process of protein synthesis. The largest among the three indispensable translation initiation factors is IF-2, which possesses a molecular mass of 97 kDa. The protein has many domains, including an N-terminal domain, a GTPase domain, a linker region, C1, C2, and C-terminal domains. The GTPase domain encompasses the G1-G5 motif, which is responsible for the binding and hydrolysis of GTP. The activity of IF2 is regulated by conformational changes induced by the binding and hydrolysis of GTP. The primary function of IF-2 is to transport the initiator fMet-tRNA to the P-site of the 30S ribosomal subunit. The C2 domain of IF2 has a unique recognition and binding affinity towards the initiator tRNA. The IF-2 protein has been observed to form a ternary complex when interacting with GTP and fMet-tRNA. This complex has been found to interact with the 30S subunit. The initiation of mRNA translation involves the placement of the start codon in the P-site through the codon-anticodon base matching with the tRNA anti-codon. IF2 regulates start codon selection accuracy and inhibits elongator tRNAs' binding by selectively binding to fMet-tRNA. Additionally, it relocates the initiator tRNA on the 30S subunit to enhance the optimum contact with the P-site. Furthermore, IF2 exhibits RNA chaperone activity, which enables it to rectify misfolded RNA structures. In general, the IF2 protein plays a crucial role in coordinating many steps of translation initiation, including the binding of mRNA and fMet-tRNA to the start codon, the joining of sub-units, and the activation of GTPase.

== IF3 ==
Initiation factor IF3 is a small protein of 21 kDa containing two compact α/β domains (IF3C and IF3N) connected by a flexible lysine-rich linker. Most IF3 functions are mediated by the IF3C domain, while IF3N regulates 30S subunit binding. Bacterial initiation factor 3 (infC) is not universally found in all bacterial species but in E. coli it is required for the 30S subunit to bind to the initiation site in mRNA. IF3 is required by the small subunit to form initiation complexes, but has to be released to allow the 50S subunit to bind. IF3 attaches to the platform side of the 30S subunit, close to helices 23, 24, 25, 26 and 45 of 16S rRNA, as well as ribosomal proteins S7, S11, and S12. The IF3C domain interacts with the 30S subunit via its conserved basic residues R99, R116, R147 and R168 . A major function of IF3 is inspecting codon-anticodon pairing at the P-site during start codon selection. It accelerates the dissociation of non-canonical initiation complexes containing mismatched or incorrect tRNAs. IF3 also inspects the initiator tRNA, rejecting elongator tRNAs and it also promotes the dissociation of the 70S ribosome into subunits, providing a pool of free 30S subunits for initiation. Another key role of IF3 is repositioning mRNA on the 30S subunit from a standby site to the P-site decoding site for start codon selection. IF3 works cooperatively with IF1 and IF2 during initiation and modulates IF2 binding and enhances the fidelity of start codon selection.
