= Mitochondrial ribosomal protein S33 =

Protein-coding gene in humans

MRPS33

Identifiers
- Aliases: MRPS33, MRP-S33, PTD003, S33mt, CGI-139, mitochondrial ribosomal protein S33
- External IDs: OMIM: 611993; MGI: 1338046; GeneCards: MRPS33
Available structures
PDB	Ortholog search: PDBe RCSB
PDB	List of PDB id codes 3J9M

Gene location (Human)
Chr.	Chromosome 7 (human)
Band	7q34	Start	141,002,610 bp
Band	7q34	End	141,015,228 bp

Gene location (Mouse)
Chr.	Chromosome 6 (mouse)
Band	6 B1|6	Start	39,778,738 bp
Band	6 B1|6	End	39,787,922 bp
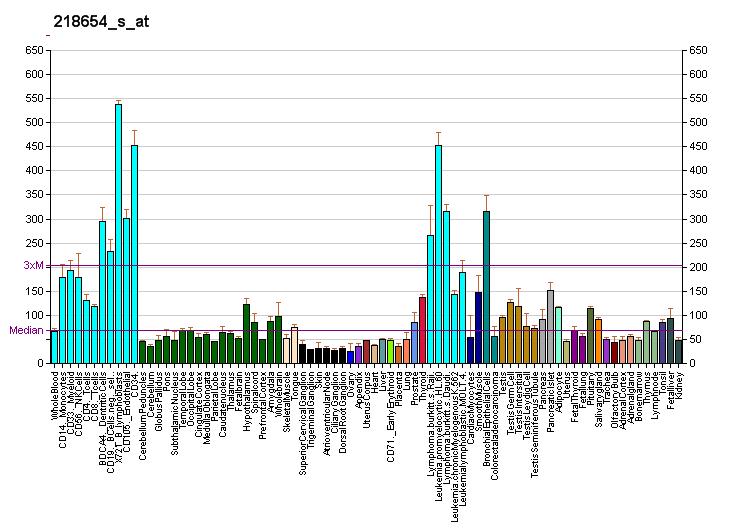
RNA expression pattern
Bgee	Human / Mouse (ortholog); Top expressed in: mucosa of transverse colon; muscle of thigh; triceps brachii muscle; rectum; thoracic diaphragm; left ventricle; islet of Langerhans; biceps brachii; gastrocnemius muscle; right auricle of heart / Top expressed in: primary oocyte; striatum of neuraxis; secondary oocyte; ventricular zone; ganglionic eminence; lens; white adipose tissue; zygote; neural tube; adrenal gland; More reference expression data
BioGPS	More reference expression data
Gene ontology
Molecular function	structural constituent of ribosome
Cellular component	mitochondrial inner membrane; ribosome; mitochondrion; mitochondrial small ribosomal subunit
Biological process	mitochondrial translational elongation; mitochondrial translational termination; protein biosynthesis
Sources:Amigo / QuickGO
Orthologs
Databases	NCBI: entry; OMA: entry
Species	Human	Mouse
Entrez	51650	14548
Ensembl	ENSG00000090263	ENSMUSG00000029918
UniProt	Q9Y291	Q9D2R8
RefSeq (mRNA)	NM_053035; NM_016071	NM_001010930; NM_010270
RefSeq (protein)	NP_057155; NP_444263	NP_001010930; NP_034400
Location (UCSC)	Chr 7: 141 – 141.02 Mb	Chr 6: 39.78 – 39.79 Mb
PubMed search
- Wikidata
View/Edit Human	View/Edit Mouse

28S ribosomal protein S33, mitochondrial is a protein that in humans is encoded by the MRPS33 gene.

Mammalian mitochondrial ribosomal proteins are encoded by nuclear genes and help in protein synthesis within the mitochondrion. Mitochondrial ribosomes (mitoribosomes) consist of a small 28S subunit and a large 39S subunit. They have an estimated 75% protein to rRNA composition compared to prokaryotic ribosomes, where this ratio is reversed. Another difference between mammalian mitoribosomes and prokaryotic ribosomes is that the latter contain a 5S rRNA. Among different species, the proteins comprising the mitoribosome differ greatly in sequence, and sometimes in biochemical properties, which prevents easy recognition by sequence homology. The 28S subunit of the mammalian mitoribosome may play a crucial and characteristic role in translation initiation. This gene encodes a 28S subunit protein that is one of the more highly conserved mitochondrial ribosomal proteins among mammals, Drosophila and Caenorhabditis elegans. Splice variants that differ in the 5' UTR have been found for this gene; all variants encode the same protein. Pseudogenes corresponding to this gene are found on chromosomes 1q, 4p, 4q, and 20q
