= Hypusine =

- Skeletal formula of hypusine

Names
- IUPAC name N^{6}-[(2R)-4-amino-2-hydroxybutyl]-L-lysine
- Systematic IUPAC name (2S)-2-Amino-6-{[(2R)-4-amino-2-hydroxybutyl]amino}hexanoic acid
- Other names N6-(4-Amino-2-hydroxybutyl)lysine

Identifiers
CAS Number	34994-11-1
3D model (JSmol)	Interactive image
ChEBI	CHEBI:21858
ChemSpider	9097677
MeSH	Hypusine
PubChem CID	10922432
UNII	3874VXF092
CompTox Dashboard (EPA)	DTXSID40896944
- InChI: InChI=1S/C10H23N3O3/c11-5-4-8(14)7-13-6-2-1-3-9(12)10(15)16/h8-9,13-14H,1-7,11-12H2,(H,15,16)/t8-,9+/m1/s1 Key: BZUIJMCJNWUGKQ-BDAKNGLRSA-N
- SMILES: C(CCNC[C@@H](CCN)O)C[C@@H](C(=O)O)N

Properties
Chemical formula	C_{10}H_{23}N_{3}O_{3}
Molar mass	233.312 g·mol^{−1}
- Except where otherwise noted, data are given for materials in their standard state (at 25 °C [77 °F], 100 kPa). verify (what is ?) Infobox references

Hypusine is an uncommon amino acid found in all eukaryotes and in some archaea, but not in bacteria. The only known proteins containing the hypusine residue is eukaryotic translation initiation factor 5A (eIF-5A) and the archaeal homolog aIF5A. In humans, two isoforms of eIF-5A have been described: eIF5A-1 and eIF5A-2. They are encoded by two distinct genes EIF5A and EIF5A2. The protein is involved in protein biosynthesis and promotes the formation of the first peptide bond. The region surrounding the hypusine residue is highly conserved and is essential to the function of eIF5A. Thus, hypusine and eIF-5A appear to be vital for the viability and proliferation of eukaryotic cells.

Hypusine is formed in eIF-5A by post-translational modification of one of the lysyl residues. Two reactions and two enzymes are involved:

1. Deoxyhypusine synthase (DHPS, DHS) catalyzes the cleavage of the polyamine spermidine and transfer of its 4-aminobutyl moiety to the ε-amino group of one specific lysine residue of the eIF-5A precursor to form deoxyhypusine and 1,3-diaminopropane. This step is universal among eukaryotes and archaea.
2. Deoxyhypusine hydroxylase mediates the formation of hypusine by addition of a hydroxyl group to the deoxyhypusine residue. This step is universal among eukaryotes, but absent in some archaea (the Euryarchaea).

Inhibition of DHPS causes cell cycle arrest in all tested archaea (Sulfolobus, Halobacterium halobium, Haloferax mediterranei).

An excess of hypusine was found in the urine of children and patients with familial hyperlysinemia.

Hypusine was first isolated from bovine brain by Japanese scientists Shiba et al. in 1971. The name hypusine indicates that the molecule comprises moieties of hydroxyputrescine and lysine.

== See also ==
- n-Butylamine, related to 4-aminobutyl group of deoxyhypusine
- Putrescine
- Polyamine
- EIF5A
- EIF5A2
- Diphthamide, another translation-related uncommon amino acid
  - EEF2, eukaryotic elongation factor 2, utilizing diphthamide
