= 23S rRNA (adenine1618-N6)-methyltransferase =

Class of enzymes

23S rRNA (adenine^{1618}-N^{6})-methyltransferase

Identifiers
- EC no.: 2.1.1.181

Databases
- IntEnz: IntEnz view
- BRENDA: BRENDA entry
- ExPASy: NiceZyme view
- KEGG: KEGG entry
- MetaCyc: metabolic pathway
- PRIAM: profile
- PDB structures: RCSB PDB PDBe PDBsum
Search
- PMC: articles
- PubMed: articles
- NCBI: proteins

23S rRNA (adenine^{1618}-N^{6})-methyltransferase (EC 2.1.1.181, rRNA large subunit methyltransferase F, YbiN protein, rlmF (gene), m6A1618 methyltransferase) is an enzyme with systematic name S-adenosyl-L-methionine:23S rRNA (adenine^{1618}-N^{6})-methyltransferase. This enzyme catalyses the following chemical reaction

S-adenosyl-L-methionine + adenine^{1618} in 23S rRNA $\rightleftharpoons$ S-adenosyl-L-homocysteine + N^{6}-methyladenine^{1618} in 23S rRNA

The recombinant YbiN protein is able to methylate partially deproteinized 50S ribosomal subunit.
