= DENR =

DENR may refer to:

- DENR (gene), human gene which encodes the density regulated re-initiation and release factor protein
- Department of Environment and Natural Resources, Philippines
- North Carolina Department of Environmental Quality, formerly the Department of Environment and Natural Resources
- Department of Environment and Natural Resources, a predecessor of the Department for Environment and Water (South Australia)
