= DHX32 =

Protein-coding gene in the species Homo sapiens

Identifiers
- Aliases: DHX32, DDX32, DHLP1, DEAH-box helicase 32 (putative)
- External IDs: OMIM: 607960; MGI: 2141813; GeneCards: DHX32
Enzyme activity
EC #	BRENDA	ExPASy	KEGG	MetaCyc
3.6.4.13	↗	↗	↗	↗

Gene location (Human)
Chr.	Chromosome 10 (human)
Band	10q26.2	Start	125,836,337 bp
Band	10q26.2	End	125,896,436 bp

Gene location (Mouse)
Chr.	Chromosome 7 (mouse)
Band	7|7 F3	Start	133,322,671 bp
Band	7|7 F3	End	133,384,455 bp
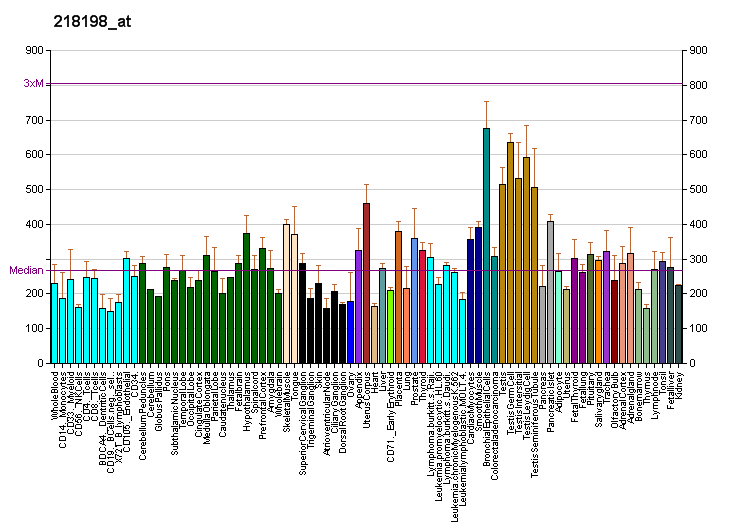
RNA expression pattern
Bgee	Human / Mouse (ortholog); Top expressed in: nasal epithelium; parotid gland; gingival epithelium; cardia; amniotic fluid; external globus pallidus; mucosa of sigmoid colon; beta cell; lateral nuclear group of thalamus; myocardium of left ventricle / Top expressed in: epithelium of lens; saccule; otic vesicle; left colon; otic placode; ventricular zone; pyloric antrum; islet of Langerhans; Paneth cell; epithelium of stomach; More reference expression data
BioGPS	More reference expression data
Gene ontology
Molecular function	nucleotide binding; protein binding; ATP binding; hydrolase activity; helicase activity; RNA binding; 3'-5' RNA helicase activity
Cellular component	spliceosomal complex; mitochondrion; nucleus; cytoplasm
Biological process	mRNA splicing, via spliceosome
Sources:Amigo / QuickGO
Orthologs
Databases	NCBI: entry; OMA: entry
Species	Human	Mouse
Entrez	55760	101437
Ensembl	ENSG00000089876	ENSMUSG00000030986
UniProt	Q7L7V1	Q8BZS9
RefSeq (mRNA)	NM_018180	NM_001286030; NM_001286031; NM_001286032; NM_133941; NM_001357685
RefSeq (protein)	NP_060650	NP_001272959; NP_001272960; NP_001272961; NP_598702; NP_001344614 NP_001390352; NP_001390353; NP_001390354
Location (UCSC)	Chr 10: 125.84 – 125.9 Mb	Chr 7: 133.32 – 133.38 Mb
PubMed search
- Wikidata
View/Edit Human	View/Edit Mouse

Putative pre-mRNA-splicing factor ATP-dependent RNA helicase DHX32 is an enzyme that in humans is encoded by the DHX32 gene.

DEAD box proteins, characterized by the conserved motif Asp-Glu-Ala-Asp (DEAD), are putative RNA helicases. They are implicated in a number of cellular processes involving alteration of RNA secondary structure such as translation initiation, nuclear and mitochondrial splicing, and ribosome and spliceosome assembly. Based on their distribution patterns, some members of this DEAD box protein family are believed to be involved in embryogenesis, spermatogenesis, and cellular growth and division. This gene encodes a member of this family. The function of this member has not been determined. Alternative splicing of this gene generates two transcript variants, but the full length nature of one of the variants has not been defined.
