= EIF5B =

Protein-coding gene in the species Homo sapiens

Identifiers
- Aliases: EIF5B, IF2, eukaryotic translation initiation factor 5B
- External IDs: OMIM: 606086; MGI: 2441772; GeneCards: EIF5B
Enzyme activity
| EC # | BRENDA | ExPASy | KEGG | MetaCyc |
|---|---|---|---|---|
| 3.6.5.3 | ↗ | ↗ | ↗ | ↗ |

Gene location (Human)
| Chr. | Chromosome 2 (human) |
| Band | 2q11.2 | Start | 99,337,371 bp |
| Band | 2q11.2 | End | 99,401,326 bp |

Gene location (Mouse)
| Chr. | Chromosome 1 (mouse) |
| Band | 1|1 B | Start | 38,037,091 bp |
| Band | 1|1 B | End | 38,094,660 bp |
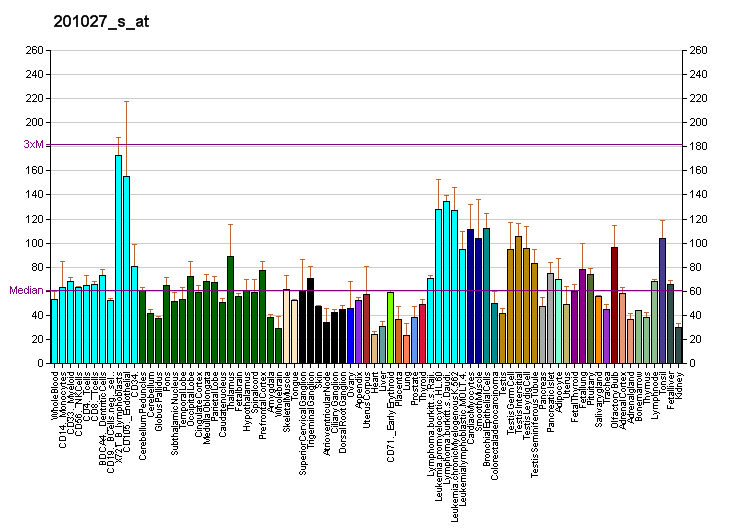

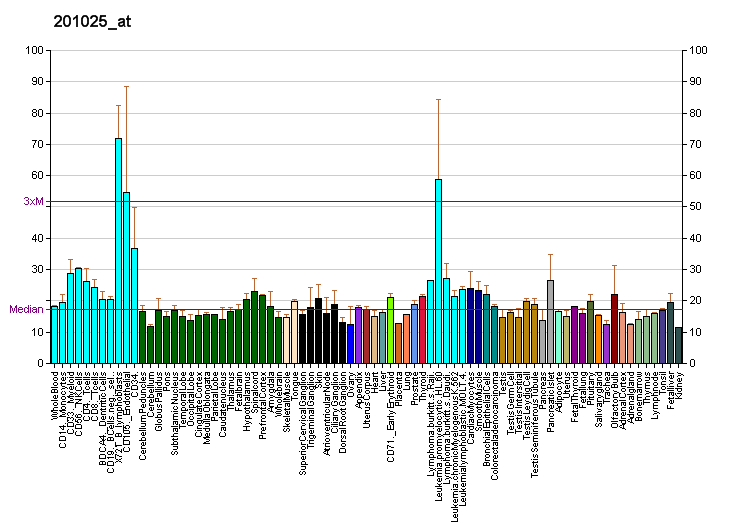

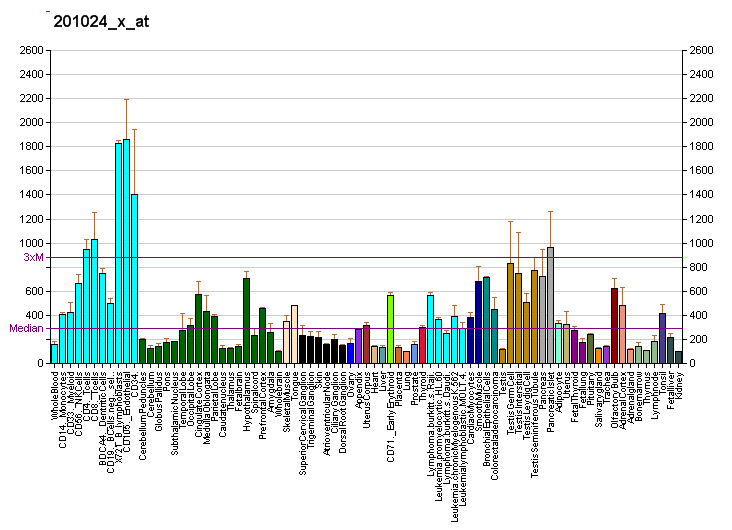
RNA expression pattern
| Bgee | Human / Mouse (ortholog); Top expressed in: tendon of biceps brachii; oocyte; secondary oocyte; internal globus pallidus; myocardium of left ventricle; gingival epithelium; pericardium; pars reticulata; cardia; external globus pallidus / Top expressed in: tail of embryo; lens; genital tubercle; zygote; epithelium of lens; secondary oocyte; parotid gland; lacrimal gland; primary oocyte; epiblast; More reference expression data |
| BioGPS | More reference expression data |
Gene ontology
| Molecular function | nucleotide binding; protein binding; metal ion binding; GTP binding; hydrolase activity; translation initiation factor activity; RNA binding; GTPase activity |
| Cellular component | cytosol; nucleus; cytoplasm |
| Biological process | regulation of translational initiation; translational initiation; protein biosynthesis |
Sources:Amigo / QuickGO
Orthologs
| Databases | NCBI: entry; OMA: entry |
| Species | Human | Mouse |
| Entrez | 9669 | 226982 |
| Ensembl | ENSG00000158417 | ENSMUSG00000026083 |
| UniProt | O60841 | Q05D44 |
| RefSeq (mRNA) | NM_015904 | NM_198303 |
| RefSeq (protein) | NP_056988 | NP_938045 |
| Location (UCSC) | Chr 2: 99.34 – 99.4 Mb | Chr 1: 38.04 – 38.09 Mb |
| PubMed search |
- Wikidata
| View/Edit Human | View/Edit Mouse |

Eukaryotic translation initiation factor 5B is a protein that in humans is encoded by the EIF5B gene. eIF5B is homologous to the bacterial initiation factor 2, sharing a core structure while their involvement in translation initiation differs.

== Function ==
eIF5B plays an important role in later stages of the translation initiation mechanism. After the start codon has been engaged by the scanning initiation complex, eukaryotic initiation factors eIF1, eIF2, and eIF5 leave the ribosome. Subsequently, eIF5B-GTP is recruited to the ribosome. eIF1A induces rotation of a domain of eIF5B-GTP, which in turn positions the initiator tRNA such that joining of the large ribosomal subunit is possible. Joining of the large subunit causes hydrolysis of the eIF5B-bound GTP, which accelerates the release of eIF1A from the ribosome. Dissociation of eIF1A leads to another rearrangement of eIF5B, placing the initiator tRNA in its final position. The hydrolysis of eIF5B's GTP reduces its affinity to the ribosome, ultimately leading to its dissociation. This concludes the initiation of translation.
