= DENR (gene) =

Protein-coding gene in humans

Identifiers
- Aliases: DENR, DRP, DRP1, SMAP-3, density-regulated protein, density regulated re-initiation and release factor
- External IDs: OMIM: 604550; MGI: 1915434; HomoloGene: 6275; GeneCards: DENR; OMA:DENR - orthologs

Gene location (Human)
Chr.	Chromosome 12 (human)
Band	12q24.31	Start	122,752,824 bp
Band	12q24.31	End	122,771,064 bp

Gene location (Mouse)
Chr.	Chromosome 5 (mouse)
Band	5|5 F	Start	124,045,238 bp
Band	5|5 F	End	124,066,898 bp
RNA expression pattern
Bgee	Human / Mouse (ortholog); Top expressed in: germinal epithelium; visceral pleura; parietal pleura; endothelial cell; Brodmann area 23; palpebral conjunctiva; gingival epithelium; tibia; pars reticulata; hair follicle / Top expressed in: primitive streak; somite; yolk sac; epiblast; seminal vesicula; abdominal wall; maxillary prominence; supraoptic nucleus; mandibular prominence; superior cervical ganglion; More reference expression data
BioGPS	n/a
Gene ontology
Molecular function	protein binding; mRNA binding; translation initiation factor activity; ribosome binding; molecular function
Cellular component	ribosome; translation initiation complex; cellular component
Biological process	translational initiation; ribosome disassembly; protein biosynthesis; formation of translation preinitiation complex; translation reinitiation; IRES-dependent viral translational initiation
Sources:Amigo / QuickGO
Orthologs
Species	Human	Mouse
Entrez	8562	68184
Ensembl	ENSG00000139726	ENSMUSG00000023106
UniProt	O43583	Q9CQJ6
RefSeq (mRNA)	NM_003677	NM_026603
RefSeq (protein)	NP_003668	NP_080879
Location (UCSC)	Chr 12: 122.75 – 122.77 Mb	Chr 5: 124.05 – 124.07 Mb
PubMed search
- Wikidata
View/Edit Human	View/Edit Mouse

Density regulated re-initiation and release factor (DENR) is a protein that in humans is encoded by the DENR gene.

== Function ==
This gene encodes a protein whose expression was found to increase in cultured cells at high density but not during growth arrest. This gene was also shown to have increased expression in cells overexpressing the HER2/neu proto-oncogene. The protein contains an SUI1 domain. In budding yeast, SUI1 is a translation initiation factor that along with eIF2 and the initiator Met-tRNA_{i}^{Met}, directs the ribosome to the proper translation start site. Proteins similar to SUI have been found in mammals, insects, and plants. [provided by RefSeq, Jul 2008].

== See also ==
- Eukaryotic initiation factors
- Eukaryotic translation
