= Long ear =

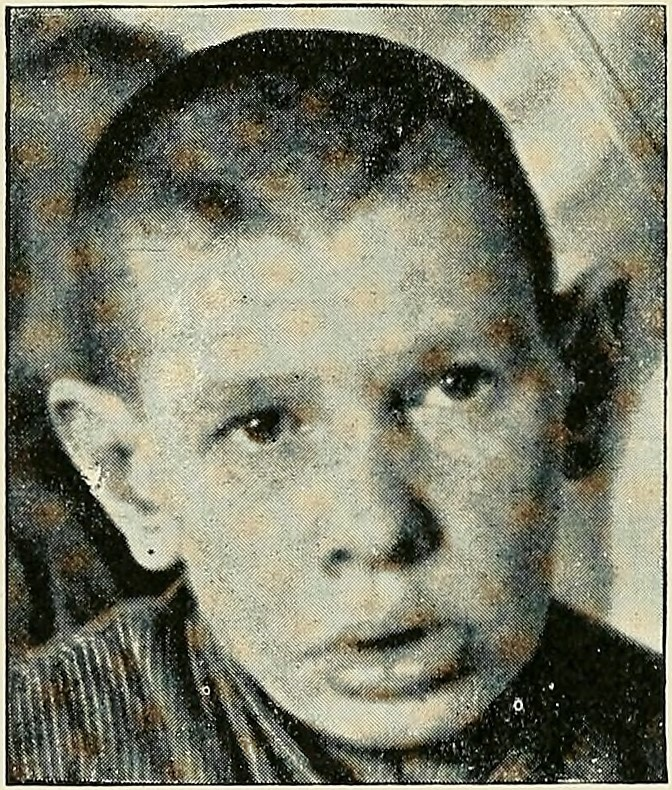
- Boy with long ears and facial asymmetry

Long ear is a condition in which the ears are unusually long from top to bottom. This is defined as the median longitudinal ear length being over 2 SD from the mean external ear length (superior to inferior aspect).

== Conditions ==
Long ear is seen in:

- Cohen-Gibson syndrome
- Congenital disorder of glycosylation, type Iw, autosomal dominant
- Diets-Jongmans syndrome
- Faundes-Banka syndrome
- Schinzel phocomelia syndrome

== See also ==
- Macrotia
