= Haloarcula marismortui =

Scientific classification
- Domain: Archaea
- Kingdom: Methanobacteriati
- Phylum: Methanobacteriota
- Class: Halobacteria
- Order: Halobacteriales
- Family: Haloarculaceae
- Genus: Haloarcula
- Species: H. marismortui

Binomial name
- Haloarcula marismortui (ex Volcani 1940) Oren et al. 1990

Species of archaea

Haloarcula marismortui is a halophilic archaeon isolated from the Dead Sea.

== Morphology ==
Haloarcula marismortui is a Gram-negative archaeon with a cell size of 1.0–2.x 2.0–3.0 μm (diameter x length). Cells are pleomorphic appearing as short rods to rectangles. H. marismortui is motile via archaellum and possesses a cell membrane that consists of triglycosyl, diether lipids, and glycoproteins.

== Metabolism ==
H. marismortui is an aerobic chemoorganotroph that utilizes glycolysis and a modified Entner-Doudaroff pathway for the breakdown of nutrients. H. marismortui utilizes energy sources such as glucose, sucrose, fructose, glycerol, malate, acetate & succinate while producing nitrogen, metabolic carbon, and acid as byproducts. Can also grow anaerobically by using nitrate as an electron acceptor.

== Genomic properties ==
The genome of H. marismortui is organized into nine circular replicons, in which individual G+C content varies from 54 to 62%. H. marismortui contains 4,366 genes and 4,274,642 base pairs (Strain ATCC 43049).

H. marismortui has one of the only two prokaryotic large ribosomal subunits which have so far been crystallized. The other one is Deinococcus radiodurans.

== Ecology ==
=== Habitat ===
Haloarcula marismortui is considered an extreme halophile and has been isolated from the Dead Sea. H. marismortui has a temperature optima between 40 and 50 °C and a pH range of 5.5–8.0. Growth can occur at a wide range of NaCl concentrations spanning 5-35% with optimal growth between 15 and 25%. The unusually large number of environmental regulatory genes found within the H. marismortui genome suggests higher fitness in extreme environments compared to other species of Halobacterium.

Adaptability

H. marismortui encodes a large family of multi-domain proteins (49) that act as sensors and regulators including Opsin proteins "Sop I & II, Hop, & Bop". These proteins help maintain physiological ion concentrations, facilitate phototaxis, and generate chemical energy via a proton gradient. H. marismortui is believed to possess over 100 ecoparalogs, genes that perform the same function under environmental stress, that helps maintain its system of environmental adaptability. Multiple genes were found to have a factor on temperature control (rrnA/B/C) and cell motility (FlaA2 & FlaB). H. marismortui encodes a large family of multidomain proteins (49) that act as environmental regulators and sensors. This allows H. marimortui to survive in highly variable environmental conditions.

High environmental adaptability makes H. marismortui an ideal candidate for future bioremediation research with the potential of utilizing its environmental sensory genes in environmental clean up.
