= Bacterial, archaeal and plant plastid code =

Genetic code found in bacteria, archaea, and plant plastids

The bacterial, archaeal and plant plastid code (translation table 11) is the DNA code used by bacteria, archaea, prokaryotic viruses and chloroplast proteins. It is essentially the same as the standard code, however there are some variations in alternative start codons.

== The code ==
Amino-acid biochemical properties	Nonpolar	Polar	Basic	Acidic	Termination: stop codon

Standard genetic code (NCBI table 1)
1st base	2nd base								3rd base
1st base	U		C		A		G		3rd base
U	UUU	(Phe/F) Phenylalanine	UCU	(Ser/S) Serine	UAU	(Tyr/Y) Tyrosine	UGU	(Cys/C) Cysteine	U
U	UUC	(Phe/F) Phenylalanine	UCC	(Ser/S) Serine	UAC	(Tyr/Y) Tyrosine	UGC	(Cys/C) Cysteine	C
U	UUA	(Leu/L) Leucine	UCA	(Ser/S) Serine	UAA	Stop (Ochre)^{[B]}	UGA	Stop (Opal)^{[B]}	A
U	UUG^{[A]}	(Leu/L) Leucine	UCG	(Ser/S) Serine	UAG	Stop (Amber)^{[B]}	UGG	(Trp/W) Tryptophan	G
C	CUU	(Leu/L) Leucine	CCU	(Pro/P) Proline	CAU	(His/H) Histidine	CGU	(Arg/R) Arginine	U
C	CUC	(Leu/L) Leucine	CCC	(Pro/P) Proline	CAC	(His/H) Histidine	CGC	(Arg/R) Arginine	C
C	CUA	(Leu/L) Leucine	CCA	(Pro/P) Proline	CAA	(Gln/Q) Glutamine	CGA	(Arg/R) Arginine	A
C	CUG	(Leu/L) Leucine	CCG	(Pro/P) Proline	CAG	(Gln/Q) Glutamine	CGG	(Arg/R) Arginine	G
A	AUU	(Ile/I) Isoleucine	ACU	(Thr/T) Threonine	AAU	(Asn/N) Asparagine	AGU	(Ser/S) Serine	U
A	AUC	(Ile/I) Isoleucine	ACC	(Thr/T) Threonine	AAC	(Asn/N) Asparagine	AGC	(Ser/S) Serine	C
A	AUA	(Ile/I) Isoleucine	ACA	(Thr/T) Threonine	AAA	(Lys/K) Lysine	AGA	(Arg/R) Arginine	A
A	AUG^{[A]}	(Met/M) Methionine	ACG	(Thr/T) Threonine	AAG	(Lys/K) Lysine	AGG	(Arg/R) Arginine	G
G	GUU	(Val/V) Valine	GCU	(Ala/A) Alanine	GAU	(Asp/D) Aspartic acid	GGU	(Gly/G) Glycine	U
G	GUC	(Val/V) Valine	GCC	(Ala/A) Alanine	GAC	(Asp/D) Aspartic acid	GGC	(Gly/G) Glycine	C
G	GUA	(Val/V) Valine	GCA	(Ala/A) Alanine	GAA	(Glu/E) Glutamic acid	GGA	(Gly/G) Glycine	A
G	GUG^{[A]}	(Val/V) Valine	GCG	(Ala/A) Alanine	GAG	(Glu/E) Glutamic acid	GGG	(Gly/G) Glycine	G

^{A} Possible start codons in NCBI table 1. AUG is most common. The two other start codons listed by table 1 (GUG and UUG) are rare in eukaryotes. Prokaryotes have less strigent start codon requirements; they are described by NCBI table 11.
^{B} The historical basis for designating the stop codons as amber, ochre and opal is described in an autobiography by Sydney Brenner and in a historical article by Bob Edgar.

As in the standard code, initiation is most efficient at AUG. In addition, GUG and UUG starts are documented in archaea and bacteria. In Escherichia coli, UUG is estimated to serve as initiator for about 3% of the bacterium's proteins. CUG is known to function as an initiator for one plasmid-encoded protein (RepA) in E. coli. In addition to the NUG initiations, in rare cases bacteria can initiate translation from an AUU codon as e.g. in the case of poly(A) polymerase PcnB and the InfC gene that codes for translation initiation factor IF3. The internal assignments are the same as in the standard code though UGA codes at low efficiency for tryptophan in Bacillus subtilis and, presumably, in Escherichia coli.

The NCBI raw format is as follows, with UUG, CUG, AUU, AUC, AUA, AUG, and GUG marked as possible initiators:

   AAs  = FFLLSSSSYY**CC*WLLLLPPPPHHQQRRRRIIIMTTTTNNKKSSRRVVVVAAAADDEEGGGG
 Starts = ---M------**--*----M------------MMMM---------------M------------
 Base1  = TTTTTTTTTTTTTTTTCCCCCCCCCCCCCCCCAAAAAAAAAAAAAAAAGGGGGGGGGGGGGGGG
 Base2  = TTTTCCCCAAAAGGGGTTTTCCCCAAAAGGGGTTTTCCCCAAAAGGGGTTTTCCCCAAAAGGGG
 Base3  = TCAGTCAGTCAGTCAGTCAGTCAGTCAGTCAGTCAGTCAGTCAGTCAGTCAGTCAGTCAGTCAG

Initiation at AUC and AUA is not addressed in the NCBI description text, but both are indeed known to occur in E. coli.

== See also ==
- List of genetic codes
