= EIF5A =

Protein-coding gene in humans

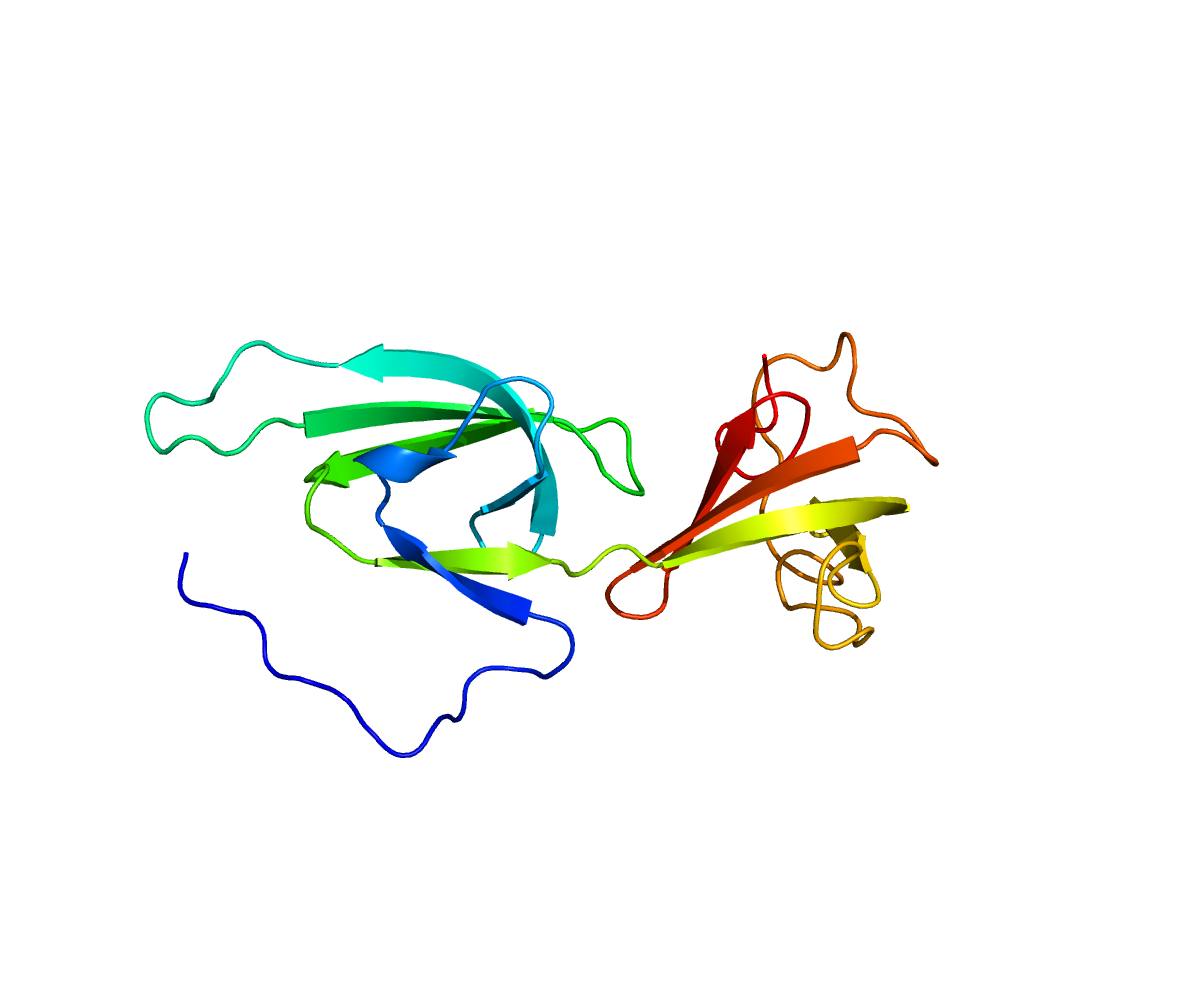

Identifiers
- Aliases: EIF5A, EIF-5A, EIF5A1, eIF5AI, eukaryotic translation initiation factor 5A, eIF-4D, FABAS
- External IDs: OMIM: 600187; MGI: 106248; GeneCards: EIF5A
Available structures
PDB	Ortholog search: I3L397 PDBe I3L397 RCSB
PDB	List of PDB id codes 3CPF, 5DLQ

Gene location (Human)
Chr.	Chromosome 17 (human)
Band	17p13.1	Start	7,306,999 bp
Band	17p13.1	End	7,312,463 bp

Gene location (Mouse)
Chr.	Chromosome 11 (mouse)
Band	11|11 B3	Start	69,807,540 bp
Band	11|11 B3	End	69,812,784 bp
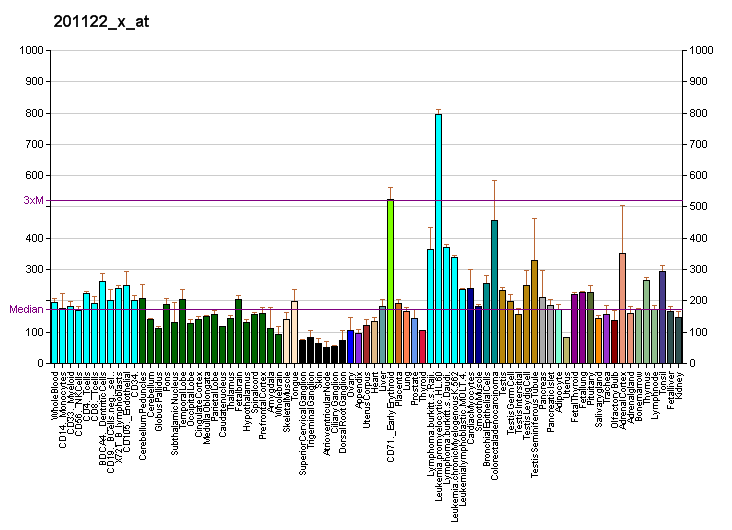

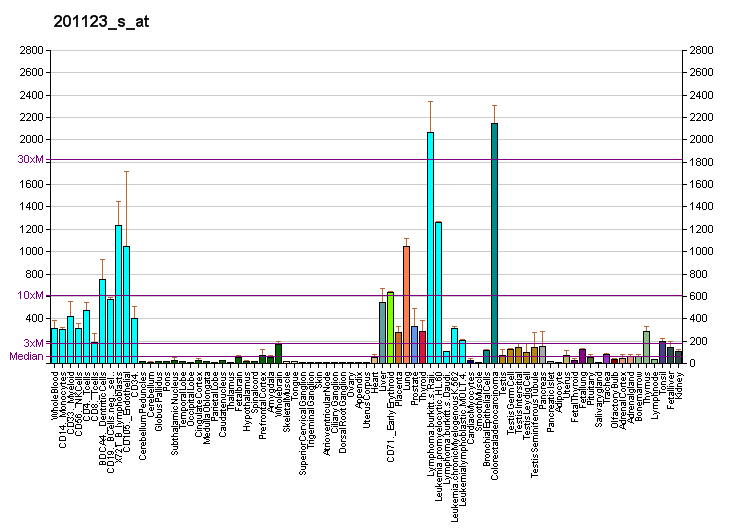

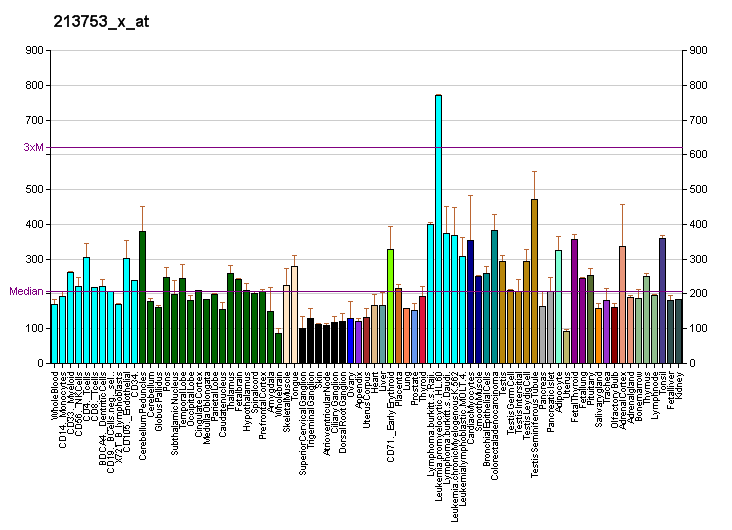
RNA expression pattern
Bgee	Human / Mouse (ortholog); Top expressed in: skin of abdomen; skin of leg; stromal cell of endometrium; mucosa of transverse colon; right testis; appendix; left testis; gastrocnemius muscle; islet of Langerhans; right adrenal gland / Top expressed in: somite; primitive streak; hand; mandibular prominence; dermis; maxillary prominence; human fetus; abdominal wall; Gonadal ridge; migratory enteric neural crest cell; More reference expression data
BioGPS	More reference expression data
Gene ontology
Molecular function	protein N-terminus binding; ribosome binding; translation elongation factor activity; protein binding; RNA binding; U6 snRNA binding
Cellular component	cytoplasm; cytosol; endoplasmic reticulum membrane; membrane; nuclear pore; lamellae anulatae; endoplasmic reticulum; extracellular exosome; nucleus; dendrite; soma
Biological process	mRNA transport; protein biosynthesis; positive regulation of translational elongation; translational elongation; mRNA export from nucleus; peptidyl-lysine modification to peptidyl-hypusine; nucleocytoplasmic transport; protein export from nucleus; positive regulation of cell population proliferation; protein transport; translational frameshifting; positive regulation of translational termination; apoptotic process; positive regulation of cytosolic calcium ion concentration; ageing; positive regulation of cardiac muscle cell apoptotic process; positive regulation of apoptotic process; negative regulation of apoptotic process; positive regulation of muscle cell differentiation; cellular response to thyroid hormone stimulus; positive regulation of reactive oxygen species metabolic process; transport
Sources:Amigo / QuickGO
Orthologs
Databases	NCBI: entry; OMA: entry
Species	Human	Mouse
Entrez	1984	276770
Ensembl	ENSG00000132507; ENSG00000288145	ENSMUSG00000078812
UniProt	P63241	P63242
RefSeq (mRNA)	NM_001143760; NM_001143761; NM_001143762; NM_001970; NM_001370420 NM_001370421	NM_001166589; NM_001166590; NM_001166591; NM_001166592; NM_001166593 NM_001166594; NM_001166595; NM_001166596; NM_181582
RefSeq (protein)	NP_001137232; NP_001137233; NP_001137234; NP_001961; NP_001357349 NP_001357350	NP_001160061; NP_001160062; NP_001160063; NP_001160064; NP_001160065 NP_001160066; NP_001160067; NP_001160068; NP_853613
Location (UCSC)	Chr 17: 7.31 – 7.31 Mb	Chr 11: 69.81 – 69.81 Mb
PubMed search
- Wikidata
View/Edit Human	View/Edit Mouse

Eukaryotic translation initiation factor 5A-1 is a protein that in humans is encoded by the EIF5A gene.

It is the only known protein to contain the unusual amino acid hypusine [N^{ε}-(4-amino-2-hydroxybutyl)-lysine], which is synthesized on eIF5A at a specific lysine residue from the polyamine spermidine by two catalytic steps.

EF-P is the bacterial homolog of eIF5A, which is modified post-translationally in a similar but distinct way. Both proteins are believed to catalyze peptide bond formation and help resolve ribosomal stalls, making them elongation factors despite the "initiation factor" name originally assigned.

== Faundes-Banka syndrome ==
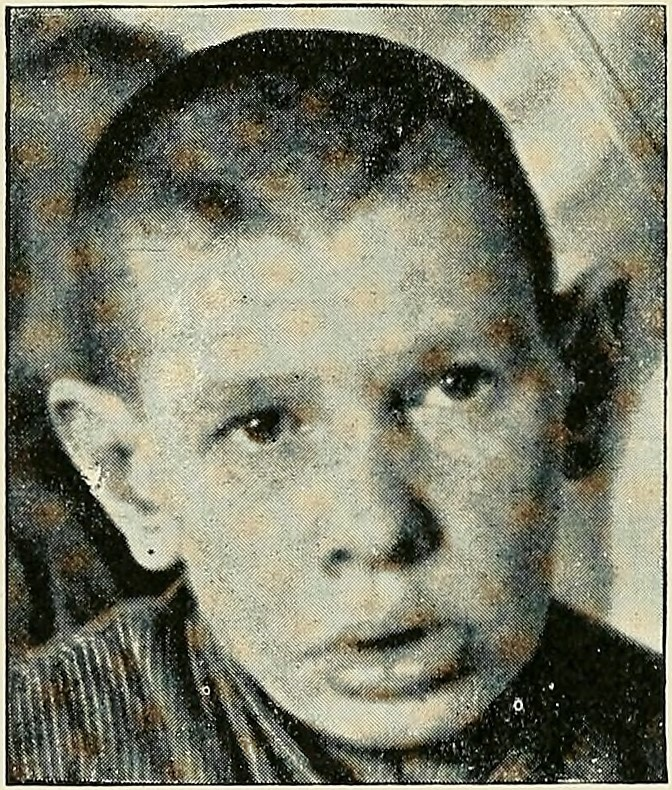
Long ear is seen in patients with Faundes–Banka syndrome.

Germline deleterious heterozygous EIF5A variants cause Faundes–Banka syndrome. This rare human disorder is characterized by variable combinations of developmental delay, microcephaly, micrognathia and dysmorphic features. It was named after Víctor Faundes and Siddharth Banka, two geneticists who discovered the condition.

== See also ==
- EIF5A2
