= Bacterial initiation factor 1 =

Translation initiation factor IF-1

Identifiers
- Symbol: TIF_IF1
- InterPro: IPR004368

Translation initiation factor IF-1

Identifiers
- Organism: Escherichia coli (strain K12)
- Symbol: infA
- Entrez: 945500
- RefSeq (Prot): NP_415404.1
- UniProt: P69222

Other data
- Chromosome: Genomic: 0.93 - 0.93 Mb
Search for
- Structures: Swiss-model
- Domains: InterPro

Bacterial initiation factor 1 is a bacterial initiation factor.

IF1 associates with the 30S ribosomal subunit in the A site and prevents an aminoacyl-tRNA from entering. It modulates IF2 binding to the ribosome by increasing its affinity. It may also prevent the 50S subunit from binding, stopping the formation of the 70S subunit. It also contains a β-domain fold common for nucleic acid binding proteins.

IF1–IF3 may also perform ribosome recycling.
