= MTIF2 =

Protein-coding gene in the species Homo sapiens

Identifiers
- Aliases: MTIF2, mitochondrial translational initiation factor 2
- External IDs: OMIM: 603766; MGI: 1924034; GeneCards: MTIF2
Available structures
PDB	Ortholog search: PDBe RCSB
PDB	List of PDB id codes 2CRV

Gene location (Human)
Chr.	Chromosome 2 (human)
Band	2p16.1	Start	55,236,595 bp
Band	2p16.1	End	55,269,347 bp

Gene location (Mouse)
Chr.	Chromosome 11 (mouse)
Band	11|11 A3.3	Start	29,476,408 bp
Band	11|11 A3.3	End	29,495,279 bp
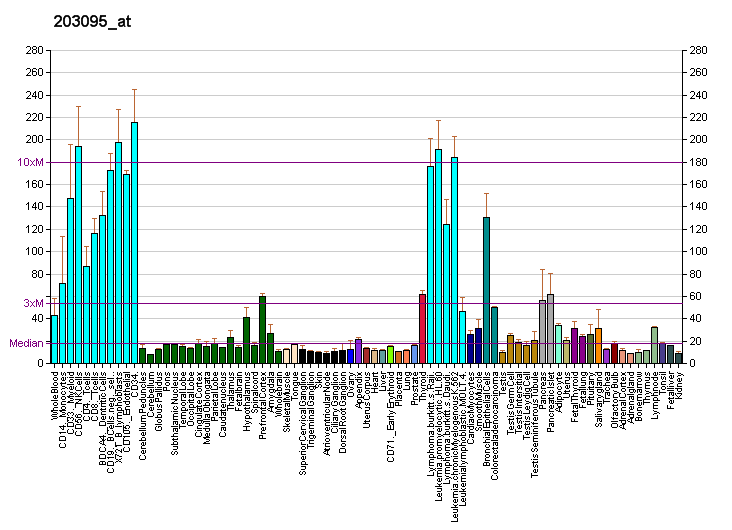
RNA expression pattern
Bgee	Human / Mouse (ortholog); Top expressed in: biceps brachii; parietal pleura; visceral pleura; germinal epithelium; epithelium of colon; Skeletal muscle tissue of biceps brachii; tibia; right ventricle; rectum; jejunum / Top expressed in: tail of embryo; myocardium of ventricle; genital tubercle; plantaris muscle; cardiac muscle tissue of left ventricle; brown adipose tissue; digastric muscle; medial ganglionic eminence; soleus muscle; right ventricle; More reference expression data
BioGPS	More reference expression data
Gene ontology
Molecular function	nucleotide binding; GTP binding; translation factor activity, RNA binding; translation initiation factor activity; ribosomal small subunit binding; RNA binding; GTPase activity
Cellular component	intracellular anatomical structure; mitochondrion; nucleoplasm
Biological process	translational initiation; ribosome disassembly; protein biosynthesis; regulation of translational initiation; mitochondrial translational initiation
Sources:Amigo / QuickGO
Orthologs
Databases	NCBI: entry; OMA: entry
Species	Human	Mouse
Entrez	4528	76784
Ensembl	ENSG00000085760	ENSMUSG00000020459
UniProt	P46199; Q6P1N2	Q91YJ5
RefSeq (mRNA)	NM_001005369; NM_002453; NM_001321001; NM_001321002; NM_001321003 NM_001321004; NM_001321005	NM_001282118; NM_001282119; NM_001282120; NM_133767
RefSeq (protein)	NP_001005369; NP_001307930; NP_001307931; NP_001307932; NP_001307933 NP_001307934; NP_002444; NP_001005369.1; NP_002444.2	NP_001269047; NP_001269048; NP_001269049; NP_598528
Location (UCSC)	Chr 2: 55.24 – 55.27 Mb	Chr 11: 29.48 – 29.5 Mb
PubMed search
- Wikidata
View/Edit Human	View/Edit Mouse

Translation initiation factor IF-2, mitochondrial is a protein that in humans is encoded by the MTIF2 gene.

During the initiation of protein biosynthesis, initiation factor-2 (IF-2) promotes the binding of the initiator tRNA to the small subunit of the ribosome in a GTP-dependent manner. Prokaryotic IF-2 is a single polypeptide, while eukaryotic cytoplasmic IF-2 (eIF-2) is a trimeric protein. Bovine liver mitochondria contain IF-2(mt), an 85-kD monomeric protein that is equivalent to prokaryotic IF-2. The predicted 727-amino acid human protein contains a 29-amino acid presequence. Human IF-2(mt) shares 32 to 38% amino acid sequence identity with yeast IF-2(mt) and several prokaryotic IF-2s, with the greatest degree of conservation in the G domains of the proteins. Two transcript variants encoding the same protein have been found for this gene.
