= EIF1 =

Protein-coding gene in the species Homo sapiens

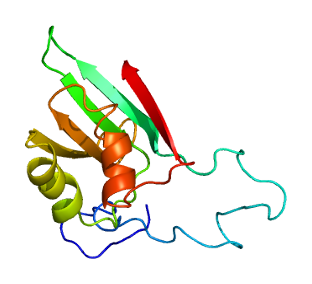

Identifiers
- Aliases: EIF1, A121, EIF-1, ISO1, SUI1, eukaryotic translation initiation factor 1, Eukaryotic initiation factor 1
- External IDs: MGI: 105125; GeneCards: EIF1
Available structures
| PDB | Ortholog search: PDBe RCSB |
| PDB | List of PDB id codes 2IF1, 4KZX, 4KZY |

Gene location (Human)
| Chr. | Chromosome 17 (human) |
| Band | 17q21.2 | Start | 41,688,885 bp |
| Band | 17q21.2 | End | 41,692,668 bp |

Gene location (Mouse)
| Chr. | Chromosome 11 (mouse) |
| Band | 11|11 D | Start | 100,210,711 bp |
| Band | 11|11 D | End | 100,212,922 bp |
RNA expression pattern
| Bgee | Human / Mouse (ortholog); Top expressed in: sperm; oocyte; parotid gland; parietal pleura; tail of epididymis; lower lobe of lung; secondary oocyte; vena cava; caput epididymis; visceral pleura / Top expressed in: granulocyte; muscle of thigh; morula; blastocyst; superior frontal gyrus; right kidney; ventricular zone; neural tube; extensor digitorum longus muscle; embryo; More reference expression data |
| BioGPS | n/a |
Gene ontology
| Molecular function | translation factor activity, RNA binding; translation initiation factor activity; RNA binding; protein binding; ribosomal small subunit binding |
| Cellular component | cytoplasm; nucleus; eukaryotic 43S preinitiation complex |
| Biological process | translational initiation; response to stress; dosage compensation by inactivation of X chromosome; protein biosynthesis; regulation of translational initiation |
Sources:Amigo / QuickGO
Orthologs
| Databases | NCBI: entry; OMA: entry |
| Species | Human | Mouse |
| Entrez | 10209 | 20918 |
| Ensembl | ENSG00000173812 | ENSMUSG00000035530 |
| UniProt | P41567 | P48024 |
| RefSeq (mRNA) | NM_005801 | NM_011508 |
| RefSeq (protein) | NP_005792 | NP_035638 |
| Location (UCSC) | Chr 17: 41.69 – 41.69 Mb | Chr 11: 100.21 – 100.21 Mb |
| PubMed search |
- Wikidata
| View/Edit Human | View/Edit Mouse |

Eukaryotic translation initiation factor 1 (eIF1) is a protein that in humans is encoded by the EIF1 gene. It is related to yeast SUI1.

eIF1 interacts with the eukaryotic small (40S) ribosomal subunit and eIF3, and is a component of the 43S preinitiation complex (PIC). eIF1 and eIF1A bind cooperatively to the 40S to stabilize an "open" conformation of the preinitiation complex (PIC) during eukaryotic translation initiation. eIF1 binds to a region near the ribosomal P-site in the 40S subunit and functions in a manner similar to the structurally related bacterial counterpart IF3.

== Structure ==
eIF1's structure was first determined in 1999 by solution-state NMR spectroscopy, which revealed that it consists of a five-stranded beta-sheet which is sided by two alpha-helices. Crystallographic experiments showed that eIF1 is located at the P-site of the small ribosomal subunit, binding to the 18S rRNA with a basic surface. To date, a number of cryo-EM structures have been solved that include eIF1 in the context of various translation initiation complexes.

== Function ==
In eukaryotic cells, translation initiation on an mRNA involves scanning of the mRNA by the 43S pre-initiation complex in search of the translation initiation start codon. Accurate identification of the start codon is very important, as other translation start sites may lead to the production of defect proteins. A codon is detected as a start codon by interaction with the tRNA's anticodon that is positioned in the P-site of the small ribosomal subunit, which leads to closing of the pre-initiation complex. eIF1 is positioned on the small ribosomal subunit such that it blocks the closure of the pre-initiation complex. It thereby aids in selecting the correct start codon, since only the correct codon-anticodon interaction provides enough energy to displace eIF1 and thus close the pre-initiation complex.

== See also ==
- Eukaryotic initiation factors
