= EIF5A2 =

Protein-coding gene in the species Homo sapiens

Identifiers
- Aliases: EIF5A2, EIF-5A2, eIF5AII, eukaryotic translation initiation factor 5A2
- External IDs: OMIM: 605782; MGI: 1933735; HomoloGene: 1490; GeneCards: EIF5A2; OMA:EIF5A2 - orthologs

Gene location (Human)
Chr.	Chromosome 3 (human)
Band	3q26.2	Start	170,888,418 bp
Band	3q26.2	End	170,908,644 bp

Gene location (Mouse)
Chr.	Chromosome 3 (mouse)
Band	3|3 A3	Start	28,835,425 bp
Band	3|3 A3	End	28,852,995 bp
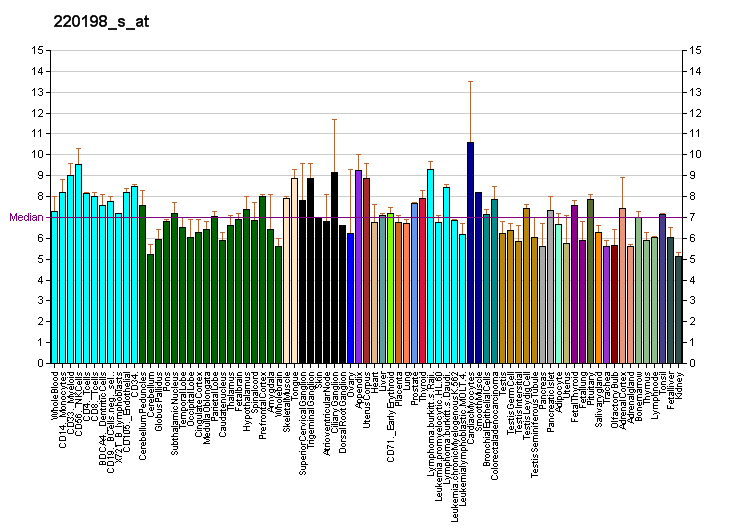
RNA expression pattern
Bgee	Human / Mouse (ortholog); Top expressed in: endothelial cell; left testis; right testis; Brodmann area 23; lateral nuclear group of thalamus; buccal mucosa cell; primary visual cortex; stromal cell of endometrium; islet of Langerhans; pons / Top expressed in: facial motor nucleus; anterior horn of spinal cord; spinal ganglia; lumbar spinal ganglion; stria vascularis; pontine nuclei; deep cerebellar nuclei; medial vestibular nucleus; trigeminal ganglion; vestibular sensory epithelium; More reference expression data
BioGPS	More reference expression data
Gene ontology
Molecular function	ribosome binding; translation elongation factor activity; protein binding; RNA binding
Cellular component	cytoplasm; cytosol; endoplasmic reticulum membrane; intracellular membrane-bounded organelle; membrane; nuclear pore; endoplasmic reticulum; nucleus
Biological process	mRNA transport; protein biosynthesis; positive regulation of translational elongation; translational elongation; polyamine homeostasis; spermatogenesis; positive regulation of cell population proliferation; protein transport; translational frameshifting; positive regulation of translational termination
Sources:Amigo / QuickGO
Orthologs
Species	Human	Mouse
Entrez	56648	208691
Ensembl	ENSG00000163577	ENSMUSG00000050192
UniProt	Q9GZV4	Q8BGY2
RefSeq (mRNA)	NM_020390	NM_177586
RefSeq (protein)	NP_065123	NP_808254
Location (UCSC)	Chr 3: 170.89 – 170.91 Mb	Chr 3: 28.84 – 28.85 Mb
PubMed search
- Wikidata
View/Edit Human	View/Edit Mouse

Eukaryotic translation initiation factor 5A-2 is a protein that in humans is encoded by the EIF5A2 gene.
