= Bacterial initiation factor 2 =

InterPro protein family

Translation initiation factor IF-2, bacterial-like

Identifiers
- Symbol: ?
- InterPro: IPR000178

Bacterial initiation factor-2 is a bacterial initiation factor.

IF2 binds to an initiator tRNA and controls the entry of tRNA onto the ribosome. IF2, bound to GTP, binds to the 30S P site. After associating with the 30S subunit, fMet-tRNA_{f} binds to the IF2 then IF2 transfers the tRNA into the partial P site. When the 50S subunit joins, it hydrolyzes GTP to GDP and P_{i}, causing a conformational change in the IF2 that causes IF2 to release and allow the 70S ribosome to form.

Human mitochondria use a nuclear-encoded homolog, MTIF2, for translation initiation.
