= Deoxyhypusine monooxygenase =

Enzyme found in humans

deoxyhypusine monooxygenase

Identifiers
- EC no.: 1.14.99.29
- CAS no.: 101920-83-6

Databases
- BRENDA: enzyme data
- ExPASy: NiceZyme view
- KEGG: enzyme entry
- MetaCyc: metabolic pathway
- Rhea: reactions
- PDB structures: RCSB PDB PDBe PDBsum
- Gene Ontology: AmiGO / QuickGO
Search
- PMC: articles
- PubMed: articles
- NCBI: proteins

DOHH

Identifiers
- Aliases: DOHH, HLRC1, hdeoxyhypusine hydroxylase/monooxygenase, deoxyhypusine hydroxylase
- External IDs: OMIM: 611262; MGI: 1915964; GeneCards: DOHH
Available structures
PDB	Ortholog search: PDBe RCSB
PDB	List of PDB id codes 4D4Z, 4D50
Enzyme activity
EC #	BRENDA	ExPASy	KEGG	MetaCyc
1.14.99.29	↗	↗	↗	↗

Gene location (Human)
Chr.	Chromosome 19 (human)
Band	19p13.3	Start	3,490,821 bp
Band	19p13.3	End	3,500,674 bp

Gene location (Mouse)
Chr.	Chromosome 10 (mouse)
Band	10|10 C1	Start	81,220,262 bp
Band	10|10 C1	End	81,224,186 bp
RNA expression pattern
Bgee	Human / Mouse (ortholog); Top expressed in: inferior ganglion of vagus nerve; internal globus pallidus; pons; ventral tegmental area; vena cava; superior vestibular nucleus; C1 segment; beta cell; subthalamic nucleus; olfactory bulb / Top expressed in: white adipose tissue; lip; bone marrow; striatum of neuraxis; quadriceps femoris muscle; right kidney; muscle tissue; muscle of thigh; embryo; Cortex of frontal lobe; More reference expression data
BioGPS	n/a
Gene ontology
Molecular function	protein binding; metal ion binding; oxidoreductase activity; monooxygenase activity; deoxyhypusine monooxygenase activity; iron ion binding
Cellular component	cytosol; cellular component
Biological process	peptidyl-lysine modification to peptidyl-hypusine
Sources:Amigo / QuickGO
Orthologs
Databases	NCBI: entry; OMA: entry
Species	Human	Mouse
Entrez	83475	102115
Ensembl	ENSG00000129932	ENSMUSG00000078440
UniProt	Q9BU89	Q99LN9
RefSeq (mRNA)	NM_001145165; NM_031304	NM_133964
RefSeq (protein)	NP_001138637; NP_112594	NP_598725
Location (UCSC)	Chr 19: 3.49 – 3.5 Mb	Chr 10: 81.22 – 81.22 Mb
PubMed search
- Wikidata
View/Edit Human	View/Edit Mouse

In enzymology, a deoxyhypusine monooxygenase (EC 1.14.99.29) is an enzyme that catalyzes the chemical reaction

protein N^{6}-(4-aminobutyl)-L-lysine + AH_{2} + O_{2} $\rightleftharpoons$ protein N^{6}-[(R)-4-amino-2-hydroxybutyl]-L-lysine + A + H_{2}O

The 3 substrates of this enzyme are a protein-bound N^{6}-(4-aminobutyl)-L-lysine, an electron acceptor AH_{2}, and O_{2}, and its 3 products are protein-bound N^{6}-[(R)-4-amino-2-hydroxybutyl]-L-lysine, the reduction product A, and H_{2}O.

This enzyme belongs to the family of oxidoreductases, specifically those acting on paired donors, with O_{2} as oxidant and incorporation or reduction of oxygen. The oxygen incorporated need not be derive from O miscellaneous. The systematic name of this enzyme class is deoxyhypusine,hydrogen-donor:oxygen oxidoreductase (2-hydroxylating). Other names in common use include deoxyhypusine hydroxylase, and deoxyhypusine dioxygenase.

== Mammalian proteins ==
The HUGO symbol for human gene and protein is DOHH, the full name is deoxyhypusine hydroxylase, and there are orthologs in other mammals. The orthologs have the same symbol, except for rodents, there the symbol is Dohh. The difference in case is just a meaningless historical artifact.
