= EIF1AX =

Protein-coding gene in humans

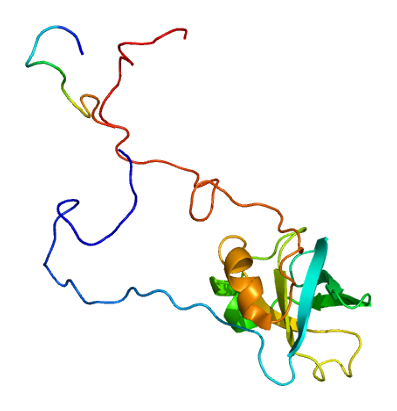
Available structures
PDB	Ortholog search: PDBe RCSB
PDB	List of PDB id codes 1D7Q, 3ZJY, 4KZY, 4KZZ

Identifiers
- Aliases: EIF1AX, EIF1A, EIF1AP1, EIF4C, eIF-1A, eIF-4C, eukaryotic translation initiation factor 1A, X-linked, eukaryotic translation initiation factor 1A X-linked
- External IDs: OMIM: 300186; MGI: 95298; HomoloGene: 20364; GeneCards: EIF1AX; OMA:EIF1AX - orthologs

Gene location (Human)
Chr.	X chromosome (human)
Band	Xp22.12	Start	20,124,525 bp
Band	Xp22.12	End	20,141,838 bp

Gene location (Mouse)
Chr.	Chromosome 18 (mouse)
Band	18|18 C	Start	46,730,768 bp
Band	18|18 C	End	46,749,523 bp
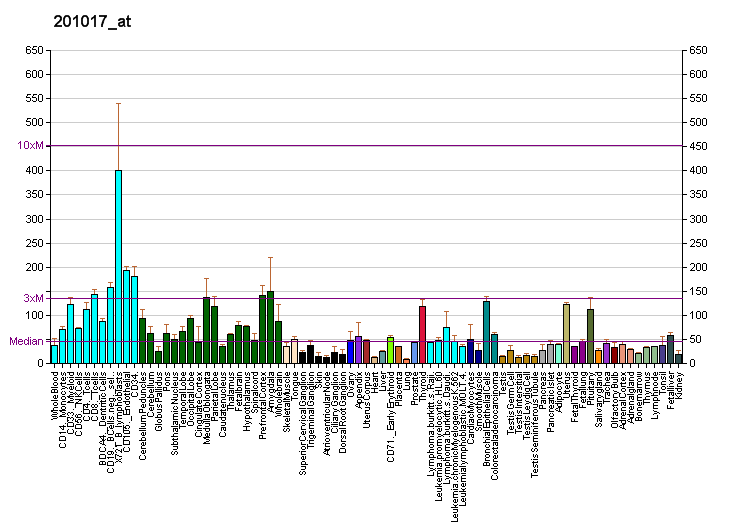

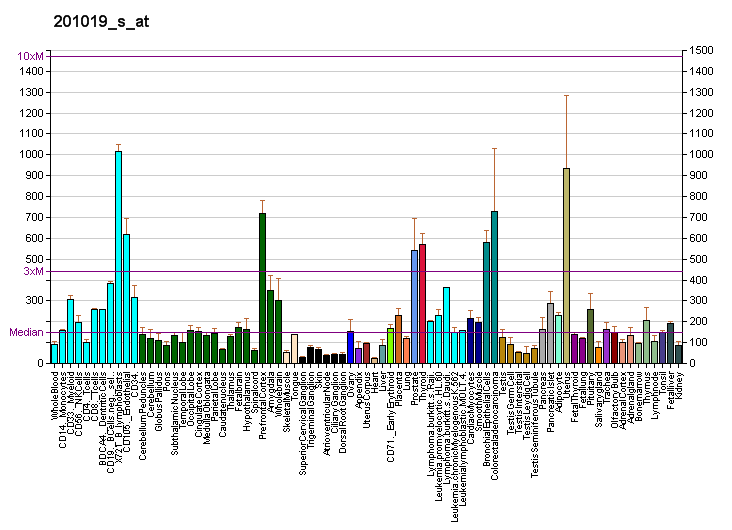

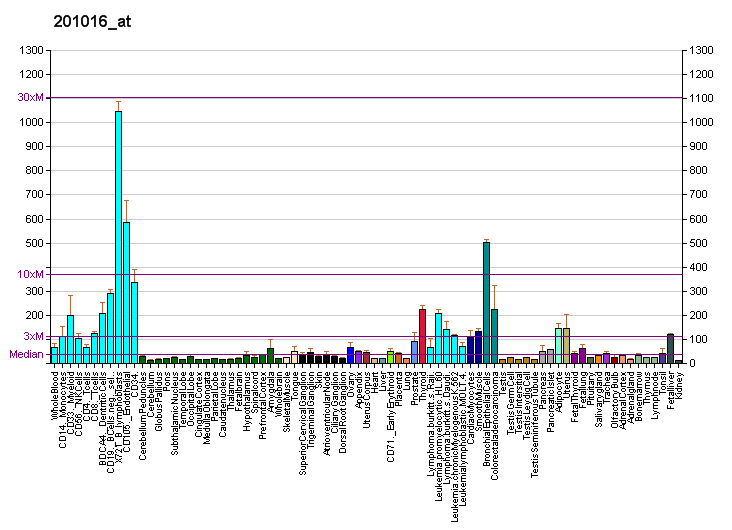
RNA expression pattern
Bgee	Human / Mouse (ortholog); Top expressed in: endothelial cell; Skeletal muscle tissue of rectus abdominis; gonad; lateral nuclear group of thalamus; biceps brachii; pons; ganglionic eminence; pericardium; Skeletal muscle tissue of biceps brachii; postcentral gyrus / Top expressed in: seminal vesicula; otic placode; saccule; pineal gland; otic vesicle; decidua; corneal stroma; epiblast; tail of embryo; calvaria; More reference expression data
BioGPS	More reference expression data
Gene ontology
Molecular function	translation factor activity, RNA binding; protein binding; translation initiation factor activity; RNA binding
Cellular component	cytosol
Biological process	translational initiation; protein biosynthesis
Sources:Amigo / QuickGO
Orthologs
Species	Human	Mouse
Entrez	1964	13664
Ensembl	ENSG00000173674	ENSMUSG00000057561
UniProt	P47813	Q60872
RefSeq (mRNA)	NM_001412	NM_010120; NM_001374654
RefSeq (protein)	NP_001403	NP_034250
Location (UCSC)	Chr X: 20.12 – 20.14 Mb	Chr 18: 46.73 – 46.75 Mb
PubMed search
- Wikidata
View/Edit Human	View/Edit Mouse

Eukaryotic translation initiation factor 1A, X-chromosomal (eIF1A) is a protein that in humans is encoded by the EIF1AX gene. This gene encodes an essential eukaryotic translation initiation factor. The protein is a component of the 43S pre-initiation complex (PIC), which mediates the recruitment of the small 40S ribosomal subunit to the 5' cap of messenger RNAs.

== Function ==
eIF1A is an important part of the translation intiation mechanism. It is located at the A-site of the small ribosomal subunit. During translation initiation, the 43S pre-initiation complex scans along the mRNA in search of a start codon. eIF1A's N-terminal tail interacts with the initiator tRNA and the start codon by extending into the P-site, thereby increasing the fidelity of start codon selection. After the start codon has been selected and eIF1, eIF2, and eIF5 have left the pre-initiation complex, eIF5B is recruited to continue the initiation process. Here, eIF1A interacts with eIF5B such that eIF5B is remodeled into a conformation that allows joining of the large ribosomal subunit. After the joining of the subunit, it is the dissociation of eIF1A that permits eIF5B to rearrange again, placing the tRNA in its final position.

== Clinical significance ==
Mutations in this gene have been recurrently seen associated to cases of uveal melanoma with disomy 3. eIF1A is mutated in thyroid cancers.

== Interactions ==
EIF1AX has been shown to interact with IPO13.

== See also ==
- Eukaryotic initiation factors
