= Translation initiation factor IF-3 =

Translation initiation factor IF-3, N-terminal domain
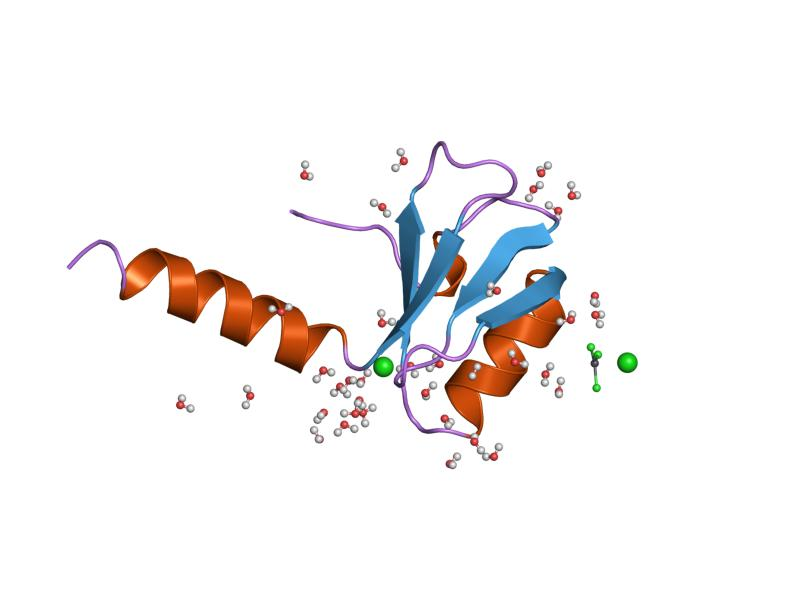
- translation initiation factor 3 n-terminal domain

Identifiers
- Symbol: IF3_N
- Pfam: PF05198
- InterPro: IPR019814
- PROSITE: PDOC00723
- SCOP2: 1tif / SCOPe / SUPFAM
Available protein structures:
- PDB: IPR019814 PF05198 (ECOD; PDBsum)
- AlphaFold: IPR019814; PF05198

Translation initiation factor IF-3, C-terminal domain
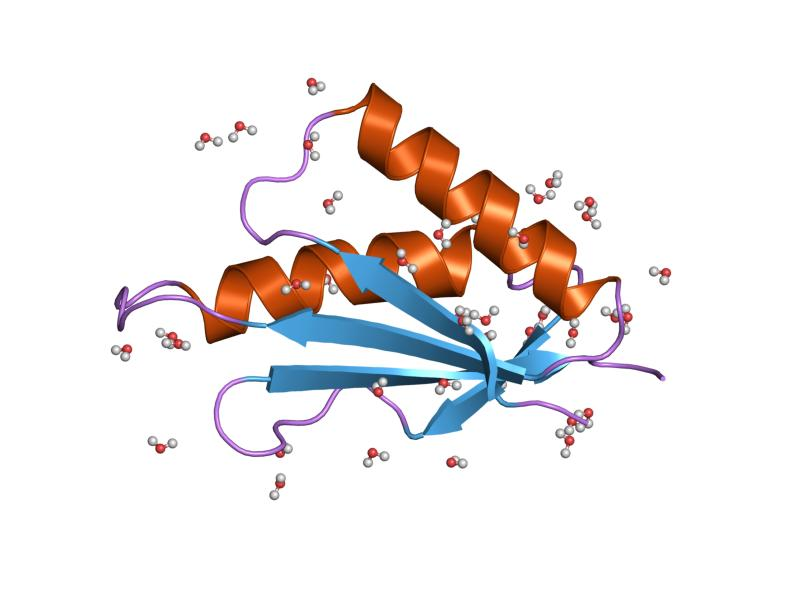
- translation initiation factor 3 c-terminal domain

Identifiers
- Symbol: IF3_C
- Pfam: PF00707
- InterPro: IPR019815
- PROSITE: PDOC00723
- SCOP2: 1tif / SCOPe / SUPFAM
Available protein structures:
- PDB: IPR019815 PF00707 (ECOD; PDBsum)
- AlphaFold: IPR019815; PF00707

In molecular biology, translation initiation factor IF-3 (gene infC) is one of the three factors required for the initiation of protein biosynthesis in bacteria. IF-3 is thought to function as a fidelity factor during the assembly of the ternary initiation complex which consists of the 30S ribosomal subunit, the initiator tRNA and the messenger RNA. IF-3 is a basic protein that binds to the 30S ribosomal subunit. The chloroplast homolog enhances the poly(A,U,G)-dependent binding of the initiator tRNA to its ribosomal 30s subunits. IF1–IF3 may also perform ribosome recycling.

IF3 is not universally found in all bacterial species. However, in E. coli, it is required for the 30S subunit to bind to the initiation site in mRNA. In addition, it has several other jobs including the stabilization of free 30S subunits, enables 30S subunits to bind to mRNA and checks for accuracy against the first aminoacyl-tRNA. It also allows for rapid codon-anticodon pairing for the initiator tRNA to bind quickly. IF3 is required by the small subunit to form initiation complexes, but has to be released to allow the 50S subunit to bind.

IF3 is made up of two domains connected by a flexible linker. Together they allow IF3 to carry out its function.

Human mitochondria use a nuclear-encoded homolog MTIF3 for translation initiation. Some bacteria, chloroplasts, and mitochondria have multiple copies of IF3.
