= Prokaryotic small ribosomal subunit =

Smaller subunit of the 70S ribosome found in prokaryote cells

Atomic structure of the 30S subunit from Thermus thermophilus. Proteins are shown in blue and the single RNA strand in orange.

The prokaryotic small ribosomal subunit, or 30S subunit, is the smaller subunit of the 70S ribosome found in prokaryotes. It is a complex of the 16S ribosomal RNA (rRNA) and 19 proteins. This complex is implicated in the binding of transfer RNA (tRNA) to messenger RNA (mRNA). The small subunit is responsible for the binding and the reading of the mRNA during translation. The small subunit, both the rRNA and its proteins, complexes with the large 50S subunit to form the 70S prokaryotic ribosome in prokaryotic cells. This 70S ribosome is then used to translate mRNA into proteins.

== Function ==
The 30S subunit is an integral part of mRNA translation. It binds three prokaryotic initiation factors: IF-1, IF-2, and IF-3.

A portion of the 30S subunit (the 16S rRNA) guides the initiating start codon (5′)-AUG-(3′) of mRNA into position by recognizing the Shine-Dalgarno sequence, a complementary binding site about 8 base pairs upstream from the start codon. This ensures the ribosome starts translation at the correct location. The tightness of the bonding between the Shine-Dalgarno sequence on the mRNA and the 16S rRNA determines how efficiently translation proceeds. Once the 16S rRNA recognizes the mRNA start codon, a special transfer RNA, f-Met-tRNA, binds and protein translation begins. The binding site of the f-Met-tRNA on the 30S ribosomal subunit is called the "D-site" This step is required in order for protein synthesis to occur. Then the large ribosomal subunit will bind and protein synthesis will continue. The binding of the large subunit causes a conformational change in the 70S, which opens another site for protein translation.

In order to form the translation complex with the 50S subunit, the 30S subunit must bind IF-1, IF-2, IF-3, mRNA, and f-met-tRNA. Next, the 50S subunit binds and a guanosine triphosphate is cleaved to guanosine diphosphate and inorganic phosphate, thus dissociating the initiation factors and resulting in protein translation. This process is called "initiation" and is the slowest process of translation.

== Structure ==
The small ribosomal subunit is made up of 16S rRNA and 19 full proteins. There is also one polypeptide chain that consists of 26 amino acids. Conventionally, the rRNA is labeled with "H#" to indicate the helix number in high resolution images. Proteins are labelled "S#" to indicate the different peptides involved in rRNA stabilization. S11 and H45 are located near the Shine-Dalgarno binding site, which is also near the IF-3 binding site. Proteins S3, S4, S5, and S12, along with H18, are located near the channel where mRNA is present in the 30S subunit.

== Inhibition ==
The 30S subunit is the target of antibiotics such as tetracycline and gentamicin. These antibiotics specifically target the prokaryotic ribosomes, hence their usefulness in treating bacterial infections in eukaryotes. Tetracycline interacts with H27 in the small subunit as well as binding to the A-site in the large subunit. Puromycin is an inhibitor of ribosomal translation. Pactamycin interrupts the binding in the Shine-Dalgarno binding region in the small subunit, thus disrupting activity. Hygromycin B also interacts with H44 and inhibits the translocation movement that is necessary during protein synthesis.

== See also ==
- Prokaryotic large ribosomal subunit (50S)
- Ribosomal RNA
- Antibiotics
