= Prokaryotic large ribosomal subunit =

Protein critical for bacterial RNA translation

Atomic structure of the 50S subunit from Haloarcula marismortui. Proteins are shown in blue and the two RNA strands in orange and yellow. The small patch of green in the center of the subunit is the active site.

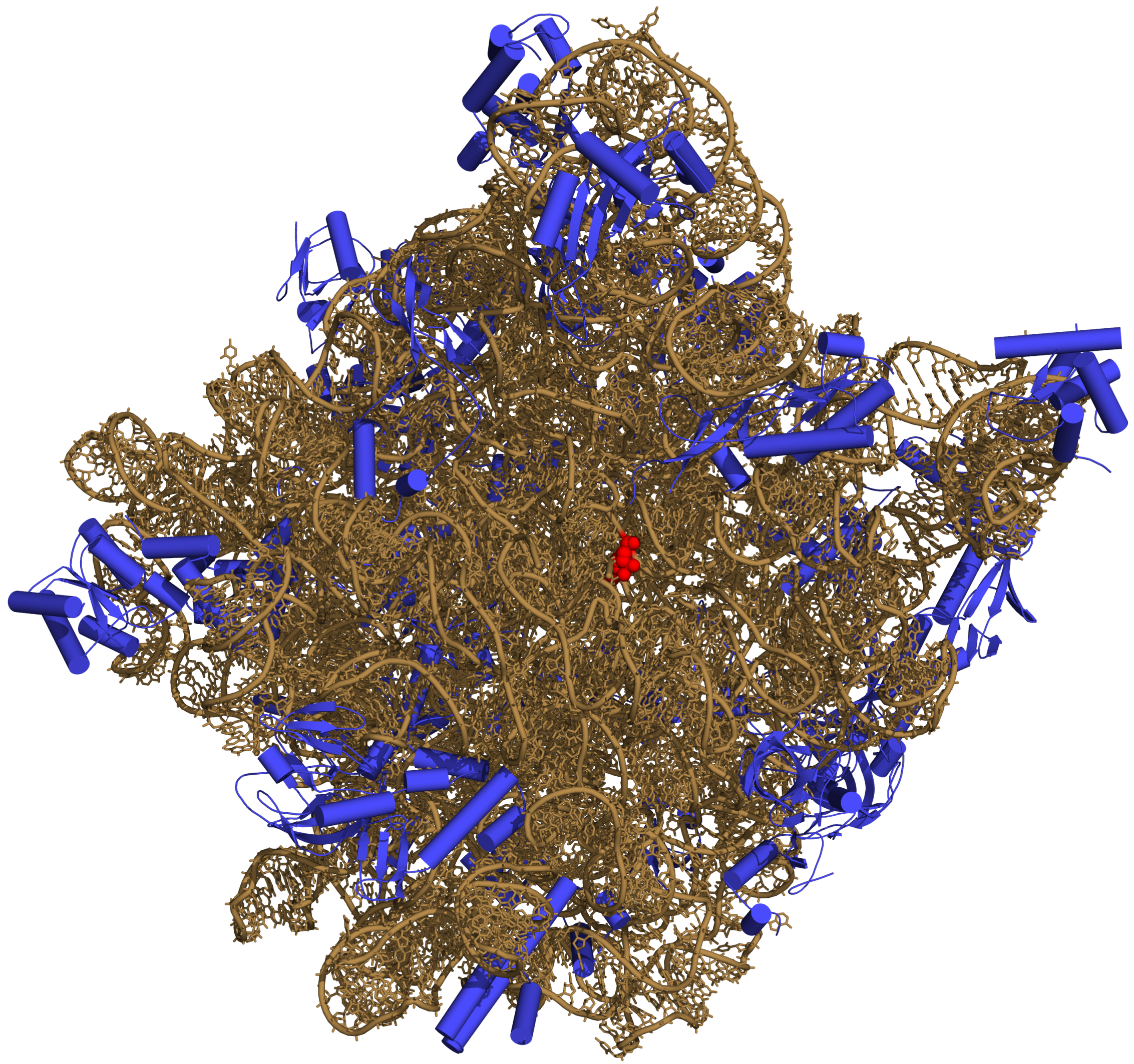
Atomic structure of the 50S large subunit of the ribosome, facing the 30S small ribosomal subunit. Proteins are colored in blue and RNA in ochre. The active site, adenine 2486, is highlighted in red. Image created from PDB: 3CC2 using PyMol

50S is the larger subunit of the 70S ribosome of prokaryotes, i.e. bacteria and archaea. It is the site of inhibition for antibiotics such as macrolides, chloramphenicol, clindamycin, and the pleuromutilins. It includes the 5S ribosomal RNA and 23S ribosomal RNA.

Despite having the same sedimentation rate, bacterial and archaeal ribosomes can be quite different.

== Structure ==
50S, roughly equivalent to the 60S ribosomal subunit in eukaryotic cells, is the larger subunit of the 70S ribosome of prokaryotes. The 50S subunit is primarily composed of proteins but also contains single-stranded RNA known as ribosomal RNA (rRNA). rRNA forms secondary and tertiary structures to maintain the structure and carry out the catalytic functions of the ribosome.

X-ray crystallography has yielded electron density maps allowing the structure of the 50S in Haloarcula marismortui (archaeon) to be determined to 2.4Å resolutionand of the 50S in the Deinococcus radiodurans (bacterium) to 3.3Å. The large ribosomal subunit (50S) is approximately twice as massive as the small ribosomal subunit (30S). The model of Hm 50S, determined in 2000 by Nenad Ban and colleagues in the laboratory of Thomas Steitz and the laboratory of Peter Moore, includes 2711 of the 2923 nucleotides of 23S rRNA, all 122 nucleotides of its 5S rRNA, and structure of 27 of its 31 proteins.

=== Ribosomal RNA ===
The secondary structure of 23S is divided into six large domains, within which domain V is most important in its peptidyl transferase activity. Each domain contains normal secondary structure (e.g., base triple, tetraloop, cross-strand purine stack) and is also highly symmetric in tertiary structure; proteins intervene between their helices. At tertiary structure level, the large subunit rRNA is a single gigantic domain while the small subunit contains three structural domains. This difference reflects the lesser flexibility of the large subunit required by its function. While its core is conserved, it accommodates expansion segments on its periphery.

=== Difference between bacteria and archaeal versions ===
A cryoEM structure of the 50S subunit from the archaeon Methanothermobacter thermautotrophicus has been determined. It shares the 50S size/sedimentation rate and the two rRNA count, but its 23S expansion segments have more in common with eukaryotes.

A cryoEM reconstruction of the native 50S subunit of the extremely halophilic Archaean Halococcus morrhuae (classified under Euryarchaeota; Stenosarchaea group) is available. The 50S subunit contains a 108‐nucleotide insertion in its 5S rRNA, which at subnanometer resolution, is observed to emerge from a four‐way junction without affecting the parental canonical 5S rRNA structure.

Due to the differences, archaeal 50S are less sensitive to some antibiotics that target bacterial 50S.

== Function ==
50S includes the activity that catalyzes peptide bond formation (peptidyl transfer reaction), prevents premature polypeptide hydrolysis, provides a binding site for the G-protein factors (assists initiation, elongation, and termination), and helps protein folding after synthesis.

=== Peptidyl transfer reaction ===
An induced-fit mechanism has been revealed for how 50S catalyzes the peptidyl transfer reaction and prevents peptidyl hydrolysis. The amino group of an aminoacyl-tRNA (binds to A site) attacks the carbon of a carbonyl group of a peptidyl-tRNA (binds to P site) and finally yields a peptide extended by one amino acid esterified to the A site tRNA bound to the ribosomal A site and a deacylated tRNA in the P site.

When the A site is unoccupied, nucleotide U2620 (E. coli U2585), A2486 (2451) and C2106 (2063) sandwich the carbonyl group in the middle, forcing it into an orientation facing the A site. This orientation prevents any nucleophilic attack from the A site because the optimal attacking angle is 105 degrees from the plane of the ester group. When a tRNA with a complete[?] CCA sequence at its acceptor stem is bound to the A site, C74 of the tRNA stacking with U2590 (2555) induces a conformational change in the ribosome, resulting in movement of U2541 (2506), U2620 (2585) through G2618 (2583). The displacement of bases allows the ester group to adopt a new conformation accessible to nucleophilic attack from the A site.

The N3 (nitrogen) of A2486 (2451) is closest to the peptide bond being synthesized and may function as a general base to facilitate the nucleophilic attack by the amino group of the aminoacyl-tRNA (in the A site). The pKa of A2486 (2451) is about 5 units higher in order to hydrogen bond with the amino group thus increasing its nucleophilicity. The elevation of pKa is achieved through a charge relay mechanism. A2486 (2451) interacts with G2482 (G2447), which hydrogen bonds with the buried phosphate of A2486 (2450). This buried phosphate can stabilize the normally rare imino tautomers of both bases, resulting in an increase in the negative charge density on N3.

=== Protein assembly ===
After initiation, elongation, and termination, there is a fourth step of the disassembly of the post-termination complex of ribosome, mRNA, and tRNA, which is a prerequisite for the next round of protein synthesis. The large ribosomal subunit has a role in protein folding both in vitro and in vivo. The large ribosomal subunit provides a hydrophobic surface for the hydrophobic collapse step of protein folding. The newly synthesized protein needs full access to the large subunit to fold; this process may take a period of time (5 minutes for beta-galactosidase).

== See also ==
- Prokaryotic small ribosomal subunit (30S)
- Ribosomal RNA
- 23S methyl RNA motif
