= SUI1 =

Single-domain protein

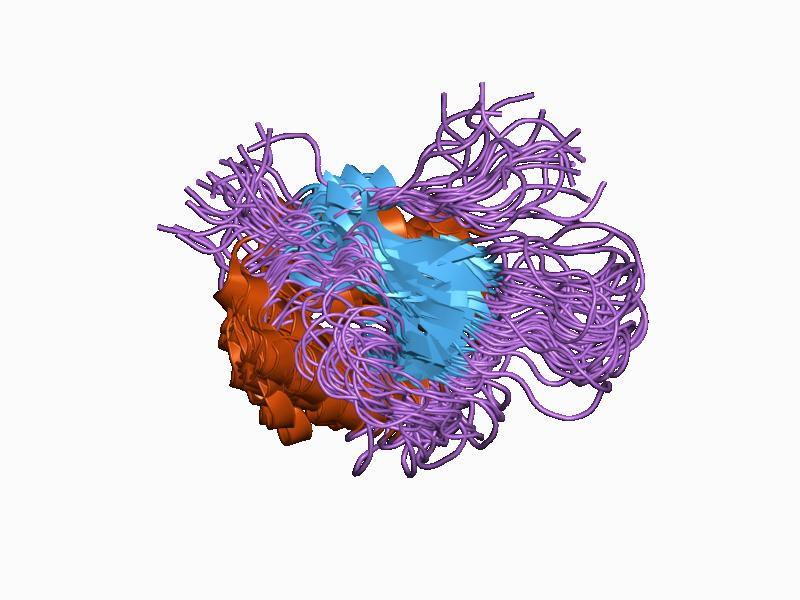
- NMR solution structure of E. coli yciH gene.

Identifiers
- Symbol: SUI1
- Pfam: PF01253
- InterPro: IPR001950
- PROSITE: PDOC00862
- SCOP2: 2if1 / SCOPe / SUPFAM
Available protein structures:
- PDB: IPR001950 PF01253 (ECOD; PDBsum)
- AlphaFold: IPR001950; PF01253

In molecular biology, the single-domain protein SUI1 is a translation initiation factor found in the fungus, Saccharomyces cerevisiae (Baker's yeast) but it is also found in other eukaryotes and prokaryotes as well as archaea. It is otherwise known as Eukaryotic translation initiation factor 1 (eIF1) in eukaryotes or YciH in bacteria.

== Function ==
SUI1 is a translation initiation factor that directs the ribosome to the translation start site, helped by eIF2 and the initiator Met-tRNA_{i}^{Met}. SUI1 ensures that translation initiation commences from the correct start codon (usually AUG), by stabilizing the pre-initiation complex around the start codon. SUI1 promotes a high initiation fidelity for the AUG codon, discriminating against non-AUG codons.

In E. coli however, it seems that the SUI1 homolog YciH is an inhibitor of translation during stress instead.

== Structure ==
The primary structure of the SUI1 protein is made up of 108 amino acids. The protein domain has a structure made of a seven-bladed beta-propeller and it also contains a C-terminal alpha helix. Homologues of SUI1 have been found in mammals, insects and plants. SUI1 is also evolutionary related to proteins from Escherichia coli (yciH), Haemophilus influenzae (HI1225) and Methanococcus vannielii.
