= Chromosome 2 =

Human chromosome

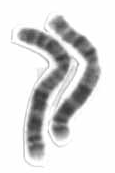
- Human chromosome 2 pair after G banding.

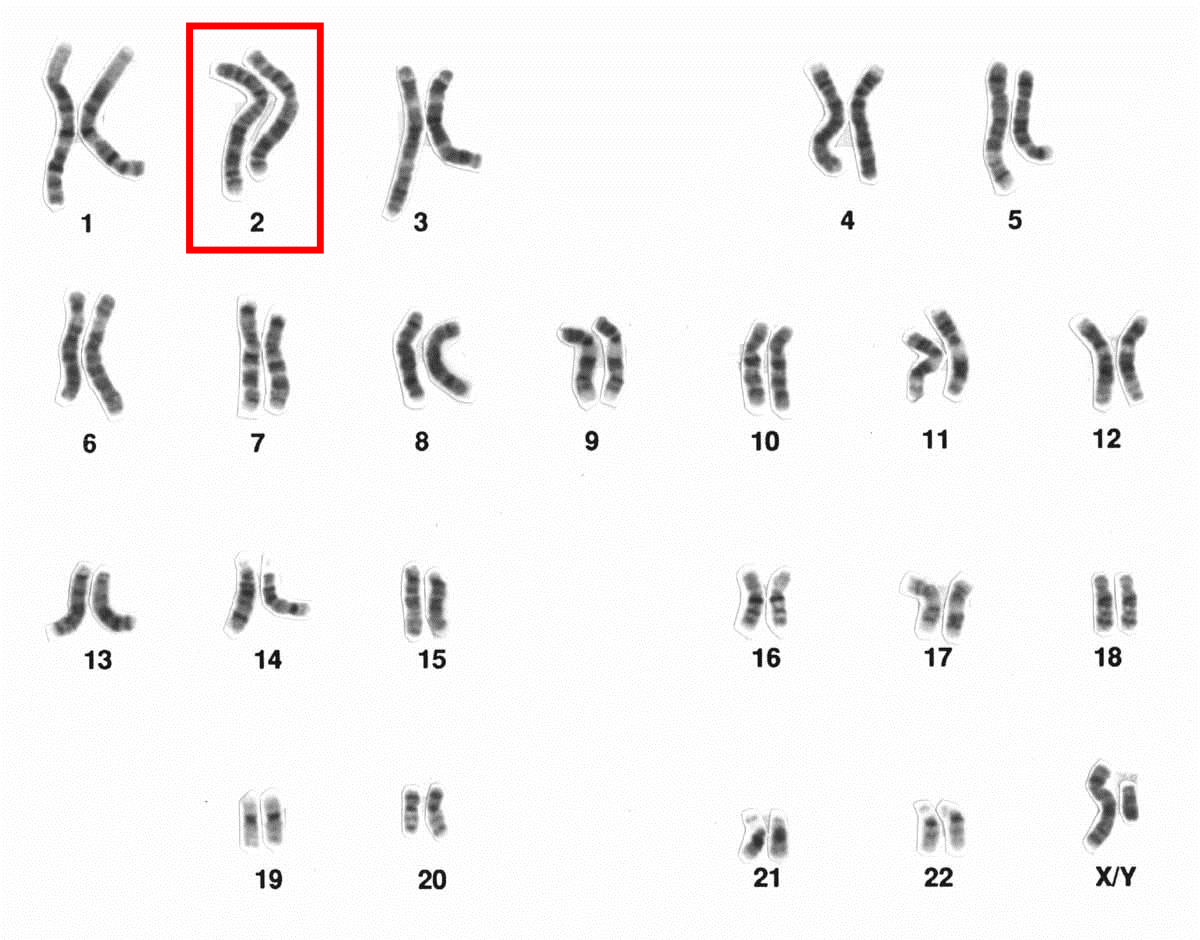
- Chromosome 2 pair in human male karyogram.

Features
- Length (bp): 242,696,752 bp (CHM13)
- No. of genes: 1,194 (CCDS)
- Type: Autosome
- Centromere position: Submetacentric (93.9 Mbp)

Complete gene lists
- CCDS: Gene list
- HGNC: Gene list
- UniProt: Gene list
- NCBI: Gene list

External map viewers
- Ensembl: Chromosome 2
- Entrez: Chromosome 2
- NCBI: Chromosome 2
- UCSC: Chromosome 2

Full DNA sequences
- RefSeq: NC_000002 (FASTA)
- GenBank: CM000664 (FASTA)

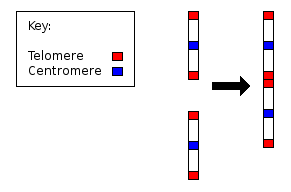
Fusion of ancestral chromosomes left distinctive remnants of telomeres, and a vestigial centromere

Chromosome 2 is one of the twenty-three pairs of chromosomes in humans. People normally have two copies of this chromosome. Chromosome 2 is the second-largest human chromosome, spanning more than 242 million base pairs and representing almost eight percent of the total DNA in human cells.

Chromosome 2 contains the HOXD homeobox gene cluster.

== Fusion ==
Humans have only twenty-three pairs of chromosomes, while all other extant members of Hominidae have twenty-four pairs. Sequencing supports the idea that Neanderthals and Denisovans also had twenty-three pairs.

Human chromosome 2 is a result of an end-to-end fusion of two ancestral chromosomes. The evidence for this includes:

- The correspondence of chromosome 2 to two ape chromosomes. The closest human relative, the chimpanzee, has nearly identical DNA sequences to human chromosome 2, but they are found in two separate chromosomes. The same is true of the more distant gorilla and orangutan.
- The presence of a vestigial centromere. Normally a chromosome has just one centromere, but in chromosome 2 there are remnants of a second centromere in the q21.3–q22.1 region.
- The presence of vestigial telomeres. These are normally found only at the ends of a chromosome, but in chromosome 2 there are additional telomere sequences in the q13 band, far from either end of the chromosome.

We conclude that the locus cloned in cosmids c8.1 and c29B is the relic of an ancient telomere-telomere fusion and marks the point at which two ancestral ape chromosomes fused to give rise to human chromosome 2.

— Jacob W. Ijdo

The timing of the fusion has been differently estimated by different researchers.

The telomere-to-telomere genome assembly and improved genome assembly techniques have enabled a closer look at the repeat-rich fusion site and the two ancestral centromere sites. The chimp and bonobo chromosome 2A and 2B respectively had an end region similar to chromosome 9 (p end) and chromosome 22 (q end). This likely happened in their common ancestor and was fueled by a pericentromeric inversion in each of their ends (the 2A inversion was only seen in these two species; the 2B inversion also in gorillas). The tips of these two end regions were themselves copies of a common ancestor and they were accidentally misaligned together in a human ancestor and lost. The residual segments similar to 9p24.3 and 22q13.33 around the fusion site support this idea. What appears as the modern vestigial telomere was already vestigial at the time of the fusion, as it was actually from the two ancient inversion events.

In 2026, it was reported that incomplete lineage sorting of segmental duplications defines the human chromosome 2 fusion site early during African great ape speciation.

== Genes ==
=== Number of genes ===
The following are some of the gene count estimates of human chromosome 2. Because researchers use different approaches to genome annotation, their predictions of the number of genes on each chromosome vary. Among various projects, the collaborative consensus coding sequence project (CCDS) takes an extremely conservative strategy. So CCDS's gene number prediction represents a lower bound on the total number of human protein-coding genes.

| Estimated by | Protein-coding genes | Non-coding RNA genes | Pseudogenes | Source | Release date |
|---|---|---|---|---|---|
| CCDS | 1,194 | — | — | | 2016-09-08 |
| HGNC | 1,196 | 450 | 931 | | 2017-05-12 |
| Ensembl | 1,292 | 1,598 | 1,029 | | 2017-03-29 |
| UniProt | 1,274 | — | — | | 2018-02-28 |
| NCBI | 1,281 | 1,446 | 1,207 | | 2017-05-19 |

=== List of genes ===
The following is a partial list of genes on human chromosome 2. For complete list, see the link in the infobox on the right.

==== p-arm ====
Partial list of the genes located on p-arm (short arm) of human chromosome 2:

- ACTR2: encoding protein Actin-related protein 2
- ADI1: encoding enzyme 1,2-dihydroxy-3-keto-5-methylthiopentene dioxygenase
- AFF3: encoding protein AF4/FMR2 family member 3
- AFTPH: encoding protein Aftiphilin
- ALMS1: Alstrom syndrome 1
- ABCG5 and ABCG8: ATP-binding cassette, subfamily A, members 5 and 8
- ASXL2: Additional sex combs like 2, transcriptional regulator
- ATOH8: encoding protein Atonal bHLH transcription factor 8
- ATRAID: encoding protein Apoptosis-related protein 3
- BCYRN1: BC200 lncRNA
- C2orf16: unknown protein C2orf16
- CAPG: capping acting protein
- CCDC104: Coiled-coil domain containing 104
- CCDC142: Coiled-coil domain containing 142
- CCDC142: Coiled-Coil Domain Containing 142
- CGREF1: encoding protein Cell growth regulator with EF-hand domain 1
- CLEC4F: encoding protein C-type lectin domain family 4 member F
- CTLA4: cytotoxic T-Lymphocyte Antigen 4
- CYTOR: Cytoskeleton regulator RNA
- DHX57: DExH-box helicase 57
- DPYSL5: Dihydropyrimidinase like 5
- ERLEC1: Endoplasmic reticulum lectin 1
- EVA1A: encoding protein Eva-1 homolog A (C. elegans)
- EXOC6B: encoding protein Exocyst complex component 6b
- FAM49A: Family with sequence similarity 49 member A
- FAM98A: Family with sequence similarity 98 member A
- FAM136A: Family with sequence similarity 136 member A
- FBXO11: F-box protein 11
- FTH1P3: encoding protein Ferritin heavy chain 1 pseudogene 3
- GEN1 encoding protein GEN1, Holliday junction 5' flap endonuclease
- GCKR: Glucokinase regulator
- GFPT1: glutamine—fructose-6-phosphate transaminase 1
- GKN1: gastrokine 1
- GPATCH11: G-patch domain containing protein 11
- GTF2A1L: General transcription factor IIA subunit 1 like
- HADHA: hydroxyacyl-Coenzyme A dehydrogenase/3-ketoacyl-Coenzyme A thiolase/enoyl-Coenzyme A hydratase (trifunctional protein), alpha subunit
- HADHB: hydroxyacyl-Coenzyme A dehydrogenase/3-ketoacyl-Coenzyme A thiolase/enoyl-Coenzyme A hydratase (trifunctional protein), beta subunit
- HSPC159: Galectin-related protein
- ID2-AS1: encoding protein Id2 antisense rna 1 (head to head)
- LCLAT1: encoding protein Lysocardiolipin acyltransferase 1
- LEPQTL1: Leptin, serum levels of
- MBOAT2: encoding protein Membrane bound o-acyltransferase domain containing 2
- MEMO1: Mediator of cell motility 1
- MPHOSPH10: M-phase phosphoprotein 10
- MSH2: mutS homolog 2, colon cancer, nonpolyposis type 1 (E. coli)
- MSH6: mutS homolog 6 (E. coli)
- MTHFD2: Bifunctional methylenetetrahydrofolate dehydrogenase/cyclohydrolase, mitochondrial
- MTIF2: mitochondrial translational initiation factor 2
- NDUFAF7: Protein arginine methyltransferase NDUFAF7, mitochondrial
- NRBP1: Nuclear receptor-binding protein 1
- ODC1: Ornithine decarboxylase
- OTOF: otoferlin
- PAIP2B: Poly(a) binding protein interacting protein 2b
- PARK3 encoding protein Parkinson disease 3 (autosomal dominant, Lewy body)
- PCBP1-AS1: encoding protein PCBP1 antisense RNA 1
- PCYOX1: prenylcysteine oxidase 1
- PELI1: Ubiquitin ligase
- PLGLB2: Plasminogen-related protein B
- POLR1A: DNA-directed RNA polymerase I subunit RPA1
- PREPL: Prolyl endopeptidase-like
- PXDN: Peroxidasin homolog
- QPCT: Glutaminyl-peptide cyclotransferase
- RETSAT: All-trans-retinol 13,14-reductase
- RNF103: encoding protein Ring finger protein 103
- RNF103-CHMP3: encoding protein RNF103-CHMP3 readthrough
- SH3YL1: SH3 and SYLF domain-containing 1
- SLC35F6: encoding protein Transmembrane protein SLC35F6
- TGOLN2: Trans-Golgi network integral membrane protein 2
- THADA: encoding protein Thyroid adenoma associated
- TIA1: TIA1 cytotoxic granule-associated RNA binding protein
- TMEM150: Transmembrane protein 150A
- TP53I3: Putative quinone oxidoreducatse
- TPO: thyroid peroxidase
- TTC7A: familial multiple intestinal atresia
- WBP1: WW domain-binding protein 1
- WDCP: WD Repeat and Coiled Coil Containing Protein
- WDPCP: encoding protein Wd repeat containing planar cell polarity effector

==== q-arm ====
Partial list of the genes located on q-arm (long arm) of human chromosome 2:

- ABCA12: ATP-binding cassette, subfamily A (ABC1), member 12
- ACTR1B: encoding protein Beta-centractin
- AGXT: alanine-glyoxylate aminotransferase (oxalosis I; hyperoxaluria I; glycolicaciduria; serine-pyruvate aminotransferase)
- ALS2: amyotrophic lateral sclerosis 2 (juvenile)
- ALS2CR8: encoding protein Amyotrophic lateral sclerosis 2 chromosomal region candidate gene 8 protein also known as calcium-response factor (CaRF)
- ARMC9: encoding protein LisH domain-containing protein ARMC9
- B3GNT7: encoding protein UDP-GlcNAc:betaGal beta-1,3-N-acetylglucosaminyltransferase 7
- BCS1L: GRACILE (Finnish heritage disease) related gene
- BMPR2: bone morphogenetic protein receptor, type II (serine/threonine kinase)
- C2orf40: encoding protein Augurin
- C2orf54: Chromosome 2 open reading frame 54
- CCDC115: encoding protein Coiled-coil domain containing 115
- CCDC138: Coiled-coil domain-containing protein 138
- CCDC74A: Coiled-coil domain containing 74a
- CCDC88A: Coiled-coil domain-containing protein 88A
- CCDC93: Coiled-coil domain-containing protein 93
- CDCA7: Cell division cycle associated protein 1
- CHPF: Chondroitin sulfate synthase 2
- CKAP2L: encoding protein Cytoskeleton associated protein 2 like
- COL3A1: collagen, type III, alpha 1 (Ehlers-Danlos syndrome type IV, autosomal dominant)
- COL4A3: collagen, type IV, alpha 3 (Goodpasture antigen)
- COL4A4: collagen, type IV, alpha 4
- COL5A2: collagen, type V, alpha 2
- DES: Desmin protein
- DIS3L2: DIS3 mitotic control homolog-like 2
- ECEL1: Endothelin converting enzyme like 1
- EPC2: Enhancer of polycomb homolog 2
- EPB41L5: encoding protein Erythrocyte membrane protein band 4.1 like 5
- ERICH2: encoding protein Glutamate rich protein 2
- FASTKD1: FAST kinase domain-containing protein 1
- IMP4: U3 small nucleolar ribonucleoprotein
- INPP1: Inositol polyphosphate 1-phosphatase
- INPP4A: inositol polyphosphate-4-phosphatase type A
- ITM2C: Integral membrane protein 2C
- KANSL3: KAT8 regulatory NSL complex subunit 3
- KIAA1211L: Uncharacterized Protein KIAA1211- Like
- LANCL1: LanC like 1
- LINC00607: Long intergenic non-protein coding RNA 607
- LOC100287387: LOC100287387
- MALL: MAL-like protein
- MBD5: encoding protein Methyl-cpg binding domain protein 5
- MFSD2B: encoding protein Major facilitator superfamily domain containing 2b
- MGAT5: mannosyl (alpha-1,6-)-glycoprotein beta-1,6-N-acetyl-glucosaminyltransferase
- MIR375: encoding protein MicroRNA 375
- MIR561: encoding protein MicroRNA 561
- NABP1: Nucleic acid binding protein 1
- NEURL3: encoding protein Neuralized E3 ubiquitin protein ligase 3
- NCL: Nucleolin
- NR4A2: nuclear receptor subfamily 4, group A, member 2
- OLA1: Obg-like ATPase 1
- PARD3B encoding protein Partitioning defective 3 homolog B
- PAX3: paired box gene 3 (Waardenburg syndrome 1)
- PAX8: paired box gene 8
- PID1: Phosphotyrosine interaction domain containing 1
- POLR1B: DNA-directed RNA polymerase I subunit RPA2
- PRR21: Proline-rich protein 21
- PRSS56: Putative serine protease 56
- RBM44: Rna binding motif protein 44
- RFX8: Rfx family member 8, lacking rfx dna binding domain
- RIF1: replication timing regulatory factor 1
- RNU4ATAC: RNA, U4atac small nuclear (U12-dependent splicing)
- RPL37A: encoding protein 60S ribosomal protein L37a
- SATB2: Homeobox 2
- SCARNA5: Small Cajal body-specific RNA 5
- SDPR: Serum deprivation-response protein
- SGOL2: Shugoshin-like 2
- SH3BP4: SH3 domain-binding protein 4
- SLC9A4: solute carrier family 9 member A4
- SLC40A1: solute carrier family 40 (iron-regulated transporter), member 1
- SMPD4: Sphingomyelin phosphodiesterase 4
- SP140: encoding protein SP140 nuclear body protein
- SP140L: encoding protein Sp140 nuclear body protein like
- SPATS2L: spermatogenesis associated, serine-rich 2-like protein
- SSB: Sjögren syndrome antigen B
- SSFA2: Sperm-specific antigen 2
- STK11IP: encoding protein Serine/threonine kinase 11 interacting protein
- TBR1: T-box, brain, 1
- THAP4: THAP domain-containing protein 4
- TMBIM1: Transmembrane BAX inhibitor motif-containing protein 1
- TMEM182: encoding protein Transmembrane protein 182
- TNRC15: PERQ amino acid-rich with GYF domain-containing protein 2
- TSGA10 encoding protein Testis specific 10
- TTN: titin
- TUBA4B: encoding protein Tubulin alpha 4b
- UBE2F: encoding protein NEDD8-conjugating enzyme UBE2F
- UBXD2: UBX domain-containing protein 4
- UXS1: UDP-glucuronic acid decarboxylase 1
- VIL1: encoding protein Villin 1
- XIRP2: Xin actin-binding repeat-containing protein 2
- ZEB2-AS1: encoding protein ZEB2-AS1
- ZNF142: zinc finger protein 142
- ZNF2: encoding protein Zinc finger protein 2

== Related disorders and traits ==
The following diseases and traits are related to genes located on chromosome 2:

- 2p15-16.1 microdeletion syndrome
- Autism
- Alport syndrome
- Alström syndrome
- Amyotrophic lateral sclerosis
- Brachydactyly type D
- Cleft chin
- Congenital hypothyroidism
- Crigler–Najjar syndrome types I/II
- Dementia with Lewy bodies
- Ehlers–Danlos syndrome
- Ehlers–Danlos syndrome, classical type
- Ehlers–Danlos syndrome, vascular type
- Fibrodysplasia ossificans progressiva
- Gilbert's syndrome
- Harlequin-type ichthyosis
- Hemochromatosis
- Hemochromatosis type 4
- Hereditary nonpolyposis colorectal cancer
- Infantile-onset ascending hereditary spastic paralysis
- Juvenile primary lateral sclerosis
- Lactose intolerance
- Long-chain 3-hydroxyacyl-coenzyme A dehydrogenase deficiency
- Lowry-Wood syndrome
- Maturity-onset diabetes of the young type 6
- Mitochondrial trifunctional protein deficiency
- Nonsyndromic deafness
- Photic sneeze reflex
- Primary hyperoxaluria
- Primary pulmonary hypertension
- Sitosterolemia (knockout of either ABCG5 or ABCG8)
- Sensenbrenner syndrome
- Synesthesia
- Waardenburg syndrome
- Hypomyelination with brainstem and spinal cord involvement and leg spasticity

== Cytogenetic band ==
G-banding ideograms of human chromosome 2

G-banding ideogram of human chromosome 2 in resolution 850 bphs. Band length in this diagram is proportional to base-pair length. This type of ideogram is generally used in genome browsers (e.g. Ensembl, UCSC Genome Browser).

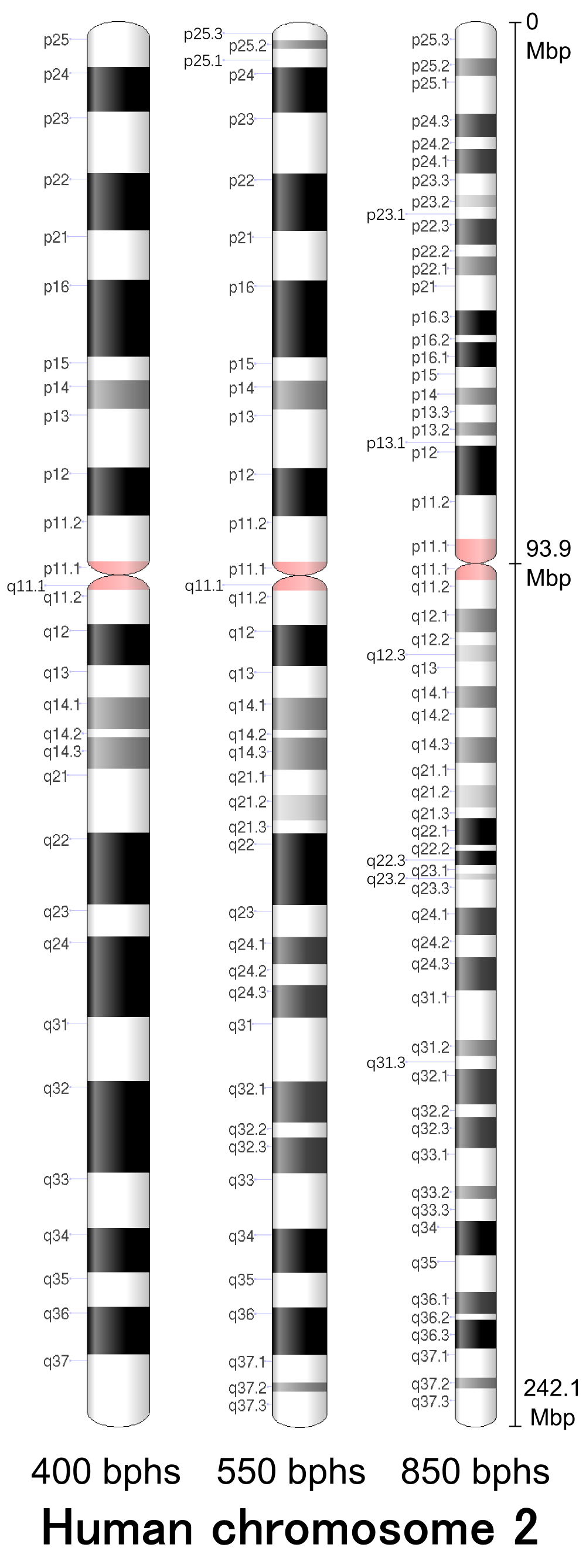
G-banding patterns of human chromosome 2 in three different resolutions (400, 550 and 850). Band length in this diagram is based on the ideograms from ISCN (2013). This type of ideogram represents actual relative band length observed under a microscope at the different moments during the mitotic process.

G-bands of human chromosome 2 in resolution 850 bphs
| Chr. | Arm | Band | ISCN start | ISCN stop | Basepair start | Basepair stop | Stain | Density |
|---|---|---|---|---|---|---|---|---|
| 2 | p | 25.3 | 0 | 388 | 1 | 4,400,000 | gneg | |
| 2 | p | 25.2 | 388 | 566 | 4,400,001 | 6,900,000 | gpos | 50 |
| 2 | p | 25.1 | 566 | 954 | 6,900,001 | 12,000,000 | gneg | |
| 2 | p | 24.3 | 954 | 1193 | 12,000,001 | 16,500,000 | gpos | 75 |
| 2 | p | 24.2 | 1193 | 1312 | 16,500,001 | 19,000,000 | gneg | |
| 2 | p | 24.1 | 1312 | 1565 | 19,000,001 | 23,800,000 | gpos | 75 |
| 2 | p | 23.3 | 1565 | 1789 | 23,800,001 | 27,700,000 | gneg | |
| 2 | p | 23.2 | 1789 | 1908 | 27,700,001 | 29,800,000 | gpos | 25 |
| 2 | p | 23.1 | 1908 | 2027 | 29,800,001 | 31,800,000 | gneg | |
| 2 | p | 22.3 | 2027 | 2296 | 31,800,001 | 36,300,000 | gpos | 75 |
| 2 | p | 22.2 | 2296 | 2415 | 36,300,001 | 38,300,000 | gneg | |
| 2 | p | 22.1 | 2415 | 2609 | 38,300,001 | 41,500,000 | gpos | 50 |
| 2 | p | 21 | 2609 | 2966 | 41,500,001 | 47,500,000 | gneg | |
| 2 | p | 16.3 | 2966 | 3220 | 47,500,001 | 52,600,000 | gpos | 100 |
| 2 | p | 16.2 | 3220 | 3294 | 52,600,001 | 54,700,000 | gneg | |
| 2 | p | 16.1 | 3294 | 3548 | 54,700,001 | 61,000,000 | gpos | 100 |
| 2 | p | 15 | 3548 | 3757 | 61,000,001 | 63,900,000 | gneg | |
| 2 | p | 14 | 3757 | 3935 | 63,900,001 | 68,400,000 | gpos | 50 |
| 2 | p | 13.3 | 3935 | 4114 | 68,400,001 | 71,300,000 | gneg | |
| 2 | p | 13.2 | 4114 | 4248 | 71,300,001 | 73,300,000 | gpos | 50 |
| 2 | p | 13.1 | 4248 | 4353 | 73,300,001 | 74,800,000 | gneg | |
| 2 | p | 12 | 4353 | 4860 | 74,800,001 | 83,100,000 | gpos | 100 |
| 2 | p | 11.2 | 4860 | 5307 | 83,100,001 | 91,800,000 | gneg | |
| 2 | p | 11.1 | 5307 | 5545 | 91,800,001 | 93,900,000 | acen | |
| 2 | q | 11.1 | 5545 | 5724 | 93,900,001 | 96,000,000 | acen | |
| 2 | q | 11.2 | 5724 | 6022 | 96,000,001 | 102,100,000 | gneg | |
| 2 | q | 12.1 | 6022 | 6261 | 102,100,001 | 105,300,000 | gpos | 50 |
| 2 | q | 12.2 | 6261 | 6395 | 105,300,001 | 106,700,000 | gneg | |
| 2 | q | 12.3 | 6395 | 6559 | 106,700,001 | 108,700,000 | gpos | 25 |
| 2 | q | 13 | 6559 | 6812 | 108,700,001 | 112,200,000 | gneg | |
| 2 | q | 14.1 | 6812 | 7036 | 112,200,001 | 118,100,000 | gpos | 50 |
| 2 | q | 14.2 | 7036 | 7334 | 118,100,001 | 121,600,000 | gneg | |
| 2 | q | 14.3 | 7334 | 7602 | 121,600,001 | 129,100,000 | gpos | 50 |
| 2 | q | 21.1 | 7602 | 7826 | 129,100,001 | 131,700,000 | gneg | |
| 2 | q | 21.2 | 7826 | 8050 | 131,700,001 | 134,300,000 | gpos | 25 |
| 2 | q | 21.3 | 8050 | 8169 | 134,300,001 | 136,100,000 | gneg | |
| 2 | q | 22.1 | 8169 | 8437 | 136,100,001 | 141,500,000 | gpos | 100 |
| 2 | q | 22.2 | 8437 | 8497 | 141,500,001 | 143,400,000 | gneg | |
| 2 | q | 22.3 | 8497 | 8646 | 143,400,001 | 147,900,000 | gpos | 100 |
| 2 | q | 23.1 | 8646 | 8735 | 147,900,001 | 149,000,000 | gneg | |
| 2 | q | 23.2 | 8735 | 8795 | 149,000,001 | 149,600,000 | gpos | 25 |
| 2 | q | 23.3 | 8795 | 9078 | 149,600,001 | 154,000,000 | gneg | |
| 2 | q | 24.1 | 9078 | 9361 | 154,000,001 | 158,900,000 | gpos | 75 |
| 2 | q | 24.2 | 9361 | 9585 | 158,900,001 | 162,900,000 | gneg | |
| 2 | q | 24.3 | 9585 | 9928 | 162,900,001 | 168,900,000 | gpos | 75 |
| 2 | q | 31.1 | 9928 | 10435 | 168,900,001 | 177,100,000 | gneg | |
| 2 | q | 31.2 | 10435 | 10599 | 177,100,001 | 179,700,000 | gpos | 50 |
| 2 | q | 31.3 | 10599 | 10733 | 179,700,001 | 182,100,000 | gneg | |
| 2 | q | 32.1 | 10733 | 11091 | 182,100,001 | 188,500,000 | gpos | 75 |
| 2 | q | 32.2 | 11091 | 11225 | 188,500,001 | 191,100,000 | gneg | |
| 2 | q | 32.3 | 11225 | 11538 | 191,100,001 | 196,600,000 | gpos | 75 |
| 2 | q | 33.1 | 11538 | 11925 | 196,600,001 | 202,500,000 | gneg | |
| 2 | q | 33.2 | 11925 | 12060 | 202,500,001 | 204,100,000 | gpos | 50 |
| 2 | q | 33.3 | 12060 | 12283 | 204,100,001 | 208,200,000 | gneg | |
| 2 | q | 34 | 12283 | 12641 | 208,200,001 | 214,500,000 | gpos | 100 |
| 2 | q | 35 | 12641 | 13014 | 214,500,001 | 220,700,000 | gneg | |
| 2 | q | 36.1 | 13014 | 13237 | 220,700,001 | 224,300,000 | gpos | 75 |
| 2 | q | 36.2 | 13237 | 13297 | 224,300,001 | 225,200,000 | gneg | |
| 2 | q | 36.3 | 13297 | 13595 | 225,200,001 | 230,100,000 | gpos | 100 |
| 2 | q | 37.1 | 13595 | 13893 | 230,100,001 | 234,700,000 | gneg | |
| 2 | q | 37.2 | 13893 | 13998 | 234,700,001 | 236,400,000 | gpos | 50 |
| 2 | q | 37.3 | 13998 | 14400 | 236,400,001 | 242,193,529 | gneg | |
