= INPP1 =

Protein-coding gene in the species Homo sapiens

Identifiers
- Aliases: INPP1, inositol polyphosphate-1-phosphatase
- External IDs: OMIM: 147263; MGI: 104848; GeneCards: INPP1
Enzyme activity
EC #	BRENDA	ExPASy	KEGG	MetaCyc
3.1.3.57	↗	↗	↗	↗

Gene location (Human)
Chr.	Chromosome 2 (human)
Band	2q32.2	Start	190,343,570 bp
Band	2q32.2	End	190,371,665 bp

Gene location (Mouse)
Chr.	Chromosome 1 (mouse)
Band	1 C1.1|1 26.99 cM	Start	52,824,586 bp
Band	1 C1.1|1 26.99 cM	End	52,856,847 bp
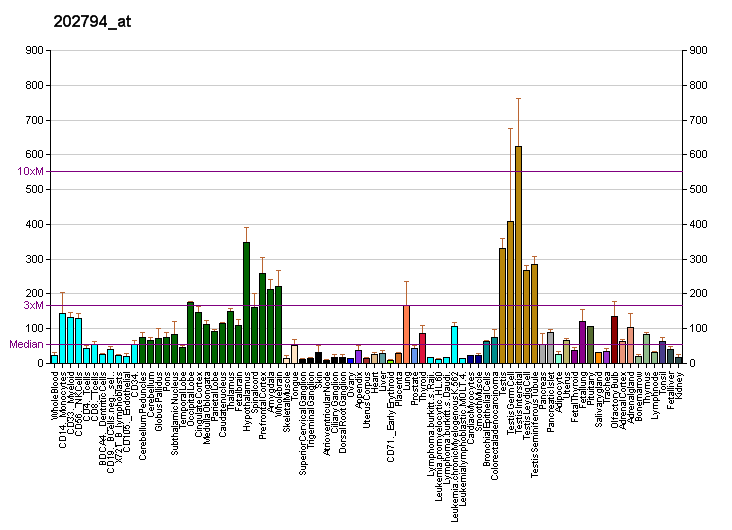
RNA expression pattern
Bgee	Human / Mouse (ortholog); Top expressed in: sperm; corpus callosum; middle frontal gyrus; mucosa of pharynx; cervix epithelium; inferior ganglion of vagus nerve; left testis; epithelium of nasopharynx; right testis; duodenum / Top expressed in: granulocyte; neural layer of retina; cerebellar cortex; thymus; dentate gyrus of hippocampal formation granule cell; spermatid; seminal vesicula; superior frontal gyrus; lobe of cerebellum; seminiferous tubule; More reference expression data
BioGPS	More reference expression data
Gene ontology
Molecular function	inositol-1,4-bisphosphate 1-phosphatase activity; inositol-1,3,4-trisphosphate 1-phosphatase activity; hydrolase activity; metal ion binding; protein binding
Cellular component	cytosol
Biological process	phosphate-containing compound metabolic process; phosphatidylinositol phosphate biosynthetic process; inositol phosphate metabolic process; signal transduction; dephosphorylation; inositol phosphate dephosphorylation
Sources:Amigo / QuickGO
Orthologs
Databases	NCBI: entry; OMA: entry
Species	Human	Mouse
Entrez	3628	16329
Ensembl	ENSG00000151689	ENSMUSG00000026102
UniProt	P49441	P49442
RefSeq (mRNA)	NM_001128928; NM_002194	NM_008384
RefSeq (protein)	NP_001122400; NP_002185	NP_032410
Location (UCSC)	Chr 2: 190.34 – 190.37 Mb	Chr 1: 52.82 – 52.86 Mb
PubMed search
- Wikidata
View/Edit Human	View/Edit Mouse

Inositol polyphosphate 1-phosphatase is an enzyme that, in humans, is encoded by the INPP1 gene. INPP1 encodes the enzyme inositol polyphosphate-1-phosphatase, one of the enzymes involved in phosphatidylinositol signaling pathways. This enzyme removes the phosphate group at position 1 of the inositol ring from the polyphosphates inositol 1,4-bisphosphate and inositol 1,3,4-trisphophosphate.
