= ECEL1 =

Protein-coding gene in the species Homo sapiens

Identifiers
- Aliases: ECEL1, DA5D, DINE, ECEX, XCE, endothelin converting enzyme-like 1, endothelin converting enzyme like 1
- External IDs: OMIM: 605896; MGI: 1343461; HomoloGene: 3549; GeneCards: ECEL1; OMA:ECEL1 - orthologs

Gene location (Human)
Chr.	Chromosome 2 (human)
Band	2q37.1	Start	232,479,827 bp
Band	2q37.1	End	232,487,834 bp

Gene location (Mouse)
Chr.	Chromosome 1 (mouse)
Band	1|1 C5	Start	87,075,377 bp
Band	1|1 C5	End	87,084,243 bp
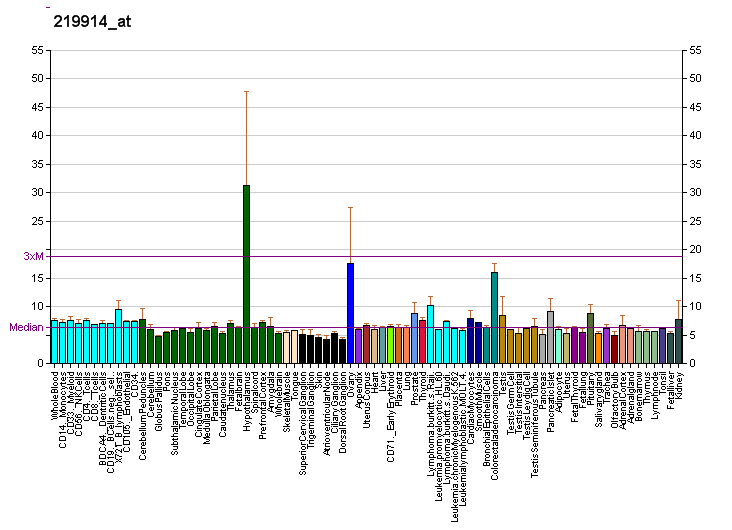
RNA expression pattern
Bgee	Human / Mouse (ortholog); Top expressed in: left ovary; right ovary; anterior pituitary; hypothalamus; testicle; right adrenal cortex; putamen; left adrenal gland; left adrenal cortex; caudate nucleus / Top expressed in: facial motor nucleus; lumbar subsegment of spinal cord; nucleus of stria terminalis; arcuate nucleus; superior cervical ganglion; superior frontal gyrus; neural tube; anterior horn of spinal cord; median eminence; nucleus accumbens; More reference expression data
BioGPS	More reference expression data
Gene ontology
Molecular function	peptidase activity; metalloendopeptidase activity; hydrolase activity; metallopeptidase activity; metal ion binding
Cellular component	integral component of membrane; integral component of plasma membrane; membrane
Biological process	respiratory system process; neuropeptide signaling pathway; proteolysis
Sources:Amigo / QuickGO
Orthologs
Species	Human	Mouse
Entrez	9427	13599
Ensembl	ENSG00000171551	ENSMUSG00000026247
UniProt	O95672	Q9JMI0
RefSeq (mRNA)	NM_004826; NM_001290787	NM_001277925; NM_021306
RefSeq (protein)	NP_001277716; NP_004817	NP_001264854; NP_067281
Location (UCSC)	Chr 2: 232.48 – 232.49 Mb	Chr 1: 87.08 – 87.08 Mb
PubMed search
- Wikidata
View/Edit Human	View/Edit Mouse

Endothelin-converting enzyme-like 1 is a protein that in humans is encoded by the ECEL1 gene.

This gene encodes a member of the neutral endopeptidase (NEP)-related family. It is expressed specifically in the nervous system. The gene disruption in mouse embryonic stem cells results in neonatal lethality due to respiratory failure shortly after birth. Based on the specific expression of this gene and the phenotype of the gene deficiency in mouse embryos, it is suggested that the protein encoded by this gene play a critical role in the nervous regulation of the respiratory system.
