= PREPL =

Protein-coding gene in the species Homo sapiens

Identifiers
- Aliases: PREPL, prolyl endopeptidase-like, CMS22, prolyl endopeptidase like
- External IDs: OMIM: 609557; MGI: 2441932; HomoloGene: 15481; GeneCards: PREPL; OMA:PREPL - orthologs

Gene location (Human)
Chr.	Chromosome 2 (human)
Band	2p21	Start	44,316,281 bp
Band	2p21	End	44,361,862 bp

Gene location (Mouse)
Chr.	Chromosome 17 (mouse)
Band	17|17 E4	Start	85,370,898 bp
Band	17|17 E4	End	85,397,669 bp
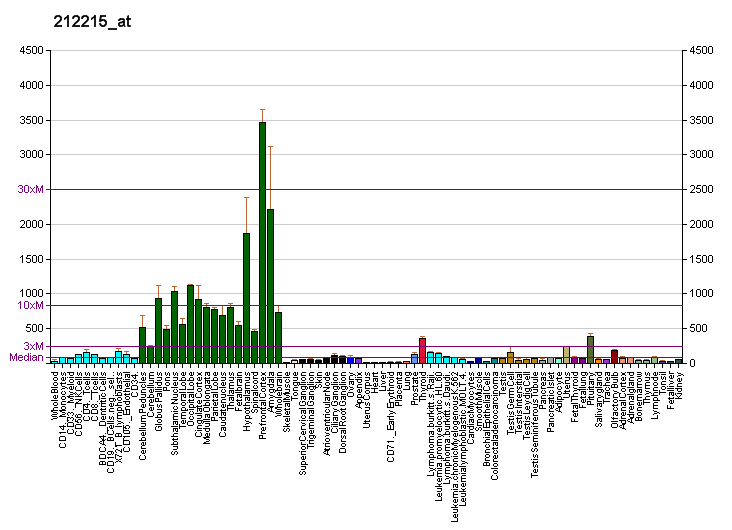

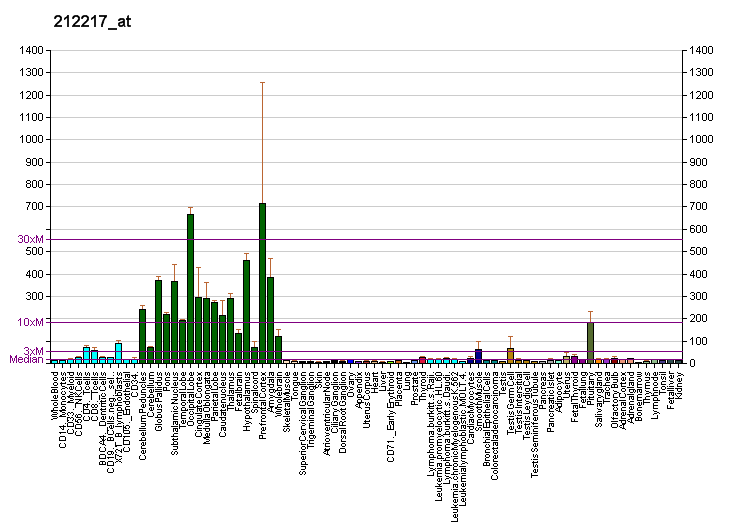

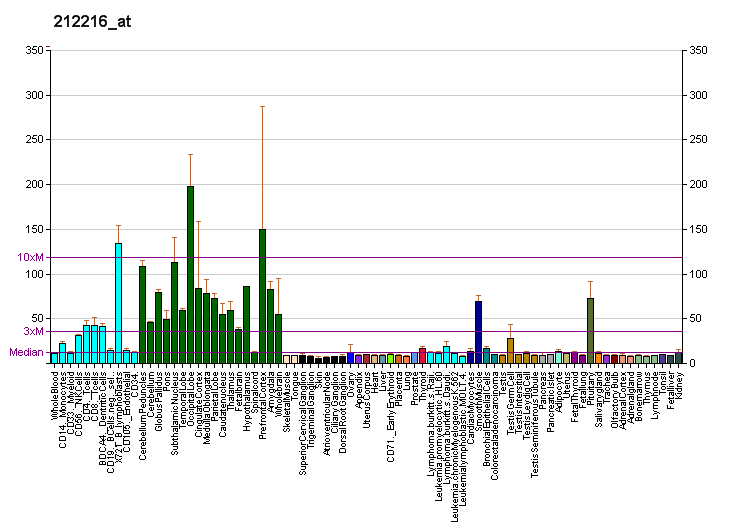
RNA expression pattern
Bgee	Human / Mouse (ortholog); Top expressed in: Brodmann area 23; endothelial cell; middle temporal gyrus; postcentral gyrus; pars compacta; lateral nuclear group of thalamus; external globus pallidus; pons; pars reticulata; entorhinal cortex / Top expressed in: ventromedial nucleus; paraventricular nucleus of hypothalamus; lateral hypothalamus; ventral tegmental area; pontine nuclei; medial geniculate nucleus; dorsomedial hypothalamic nucleus; medial vestibular nucleus; inferior colliculi; central gray substance of midbrain; More reference expression data
BioGPS	More reference expression data
Gene ontology
Molecular function	serine-type exopeptidase activity; peptidase activity; serine-type peptidase activity; hydrolase activity; serine-type endopeptidase activity; protein binding
Cellular component	cytoplasm; cytosol; Golgi apparatus; cytoskeleton
Biological process	proteolysis; regulation of synaptic vesicle exocytosis
Sources:Amigo / QuickGO
Orthologs
Species	Human	Mouse
Entrez	9581	213760
Ensembl	ENSG00000138078	ENSMUSG00000024127
UniProt	Q4J6C6	Q8C167
RefSeq (mRNA)	NM_001042385; NM_001042386; NM_001171603; NM_001171606; NM_001171613 NM_001171617; NM_006036; NM_001374275; NM_001374276; NM_001374277	NM_001163622; NM_001163623; NM_001163624; NM_145984
RefSeq (protein)	NP_001035844; NP_001035845; NP_001165074; NP_001165077; NP_001165084 NP_001165088; NP_006027; NP_001361204; NP_001361205; NP_001361206	NP_001157094; NP_001157095; NP_001157096; NP_666096
Location (UCSC)	Chr 2: 44.32 – 44.36 Mb	Chr 17: 85.37 – 85.4 Mb
PubMed search
- Wikidata
View/Edit Human	View/Edit Mouse

Prolyl endopeptidase-like is an enzyme that in humans is encoded by the PREPL gene.

PREPL belongs to the prolyloligopeptidase subfamily of serine peptidases (Parvari et al., 2005).[supplied by OMIM]
