= Lysocardiolipin acyltransferase 1 =

Protein-coding gene in the species Homo sapiens

LCLAT1

Identifiers
- Aliases: LCLAT1, 1AGPAT8, AGPAT8, ALCAT1, HSRG1849, LYCAT, UNQ1849, lysocardiolipin acyltransferase 1
- External IDs: OMIM: 614241; MGI: 2684937; GeneCards: LCLAT1
Enzyme activity
EC #	BRENDA	ExPASy	KEGG	MetaCyc
2.3.1.51	↗	↗	↗	↗

Gene location (Human)
Chr.	Chromosome 2 (human)
Band	2p23.1	Start	30,447,226 bp
Band	2p23.1	End	30,644,225 bp

Gene location (Mouse)
Chr.	Chromosome 17 (mouse)
Band	17|17 E1.3- E2	Start	73,414,980 bp
Band	17|17 E1.3- E2	End	73,550,363 bp
RNA expression pattern
Bgee	Human / Mouse (ortholog); Top expressed in: myocardium of left ventricle; pancreatic epithelial cell; mucosa of ileum; pancreatic ductal cell; endothelial cell; testicle; jejunal mucosa; saphenous vein; right ventricle; bronchial epithelial cell / Top expressed in: epithelium of small intestine; right ventricle; Ileal epithelium; saccule; myocardium of ventricle; cardiac muscle tissue of left ventricle; interventricular septum; otic placode; calvaria; otic vesicle; More reference expression data
BioGPS	n/a
Gene ontology
Molecular function	transferase activity; acyltransferase activity; protein binding; O-acyltransferase activity; 1-acylglycerol-3-phosphate O-acyltransferase activity
Cellular component	integral component of membrane; endoplasmic reticulum membrane; membrane; endoplasmic reticulum; cytosol
Biological process	phosphatidic acid biosynthetic process; multicellular organism development; CDP-diacylglycerol biosynthetic process; metabolism; cardiolipin acyl-chain remodeling; lipid metabolism; phospholipid biosynthetic process; phospholipid metabolic process; phosphatidylinositol acyl-chain remodeling
Sources:Amigo / QuickGO
Orthologs
Databases	NCBI: entry; OMA: entry
Species	Human	Mouse
Entrez	253558	225010
Ensembl	ENSG00000172954	ENSMUSG00000054469
UniProt	Q6UWP7	Q3UN02
RefSeq (mRNA)	NM_001002257; NM_001304445; NM_001304446; NM_182551	NM_001081071; NM_001177967; NM_001177968
RefSeq (protein)	NP_001002257; NP_001291374; NP_001291375; NP_872357	NP_001074540; NP_001171438; NP_001171439
Location (UCSC)	Chr 2: 30.45 – 30.64 Mb	Chr 17: 73.41 – 73.55 Mb
PubMed search
- Wikidata
View/Edit Human	View/Edit Mouse

Lysocardiolipin acyltransferase 1 is a protein that in humans is encoded by the LCLAT1 gene.
