= ERLEC1 =

Protein-coding gene in the species Homo sapiens

Identifiers
- Aliases: ERLEC1, C2orf30, CIM, CL24936, CL25084, HEL117, XTP3-B, XTP3TPB, endoplasmic reticulum lectin 1
- External IDs: OMIM: 611229; MGI: 1914003; HomoloGene: 9247; GeneCards: ERLEC1; OMA:ERLEC1 - orthologs

Gene location (Human)
| Chr. | Chromosome 2 (human) |
| Band | 2p16.2 | Start | 53,787,009 bp |
| Band | 2p16.2 | End | 53,833,038 bp |

Gene location (Mouse)
| Chr. | Chromosome 11 (mouse) |
| Band | 11|11 A4 | Start | 30,930,774 bp |
| Band | 11|11 A4 | End | 30,954,335 bp |
RNA expression pattern
| Bgee | Human / Mouse (ortholog); Top expressed in: pancreatic epithelial cell; endothelial cell; mucosa of ileum; cardiac muscle tissue of right atrium; tibia; tibialis anterior muscle; pancreatic ductal cell; decidua; corpus epididymis; middle temporal gyrus / Top expressed in: seminal vesicula; Rostral migratory stream; Epithelium of choroid plexus; fossa; parotid gland; stroma of bone marrow; islet of Langerhans; supraoptic nucleus; retinal pigment epithelium; calvaria; More reference expression data |
| BioGPS | n/a |
Gene ontology
| Molecular function | unfolded protein binding; protein binding |
| Cellular component | endoplasmic reticulum lumen; endoplasmic reticulum quality control compartment; endoplasmic reticulum |
| Biological process | ERAD pathway; negative regulation of retrograde protein transport, ER to cytosol; transmembrane transport; ubiquitin-dependent ERAD pathway; retrograde protein transport, ER to cytosol |
Sources:Amigo / QuickGO
Orthologs
| Species | Human | Mouse |
| Entrez | 27248 | 66753 |
| Ensembl | ENSG00000068912 | ENSMUSG00000020311 |
| UniProt | Q96DZ1 | Q8VEH8 |
| RefSeq (mRNA) | NM_001127397; NM_001127398; NM_015701 | NM_025745 |
| RefSeq (protein) | NP_001120869; NP_001120870; NP_056516 | NP_080021 |
| Location (UCSC) | Chr 2: 53.79 – 53.83 Mb | Chr 11: 30.93 – 30.95 Mb |
| PubMed search |
- Wikidata
| View/Edit Human | View/Edit Mouse |

Endoplasmic reticulum lectin 1 is a protein that in humans is encoded by the ERLEC1 gene.
