= MAB21L4 =

Protein-coding gene in humans

Identifiers
- Aliases: MAB21L4, chromosome 2 open reading frame 54, mab-21 like 4, C2orf54
- External IDs: MGI: 1919124; GeneCards: MAB21L4

Gene location (Human)
Chr.	Chromosome 2 (human)
Band	2q37.3	Start	240,886,048 bp
Band	2q37.3	End	240,896,889 bp

Gene location (Mouse)
Chr.	Chromosome 1 (mouse)
Band	1|1 D	Start	93,079,071 bp
Band	1|1 D	End	93,088,670 bp
RNA expression pattern
Bgee	Human / Mouse (ortholog); Top expressed in: skin of abdomen; skin of leg; epithelium of esophagus; cervix epithelium; oral cavity; skin of arm; mucosa of pharynx; mucosa of transverse colon; vagina; gonad / Top expressed in: esophagus; conjunctival fornix; lip; skin of abdomen; right lung lobe; cornea; left lung lobe; skin of back; embryo; skin of external ear; More reference expression data
BioGPS	n/a
Orthologs
Databases	NCBI: entry; OMA: entry
Species	Human	Mouse
Entrez	79919	71874
Ensembl	ENSG00000172478	ENSMUSG00000034159
UniProt	Q08AI8	Q8CEZ4
RefSeq (mRNA)	NM_001085437; NM_001282921; NM_024861	NM_001159940; NM_172411
RefSeq (protein)	NP_001078906; NP_001269850; NP_079137	NP_001153412; NP_765999
Location (UCSC)	Chr 2: 240.89 – 240.9 Mb	Chr 1: 93.08 – 93.09 Mb
PubMed search
- Wikidata
View/Edit Human	View/Edit Mouse

Protein mab-21-like 4, is a protein that in humans is encoded by the MAB21L4 gene (previously C2orf54). Not much has been reported about the function of this MAB21-family protein, but it is highly expressed in the esophagus.
