= Enhancer of polycomb homolog 2 =

Protein found in humans

EPC2

Identifiers
- Aliases: EPC2, EPC-LIKE, enhancer of polycomb homolog 2
- External IDs: OMIM: 611000; MGI: 1278321; GeneCards: EPC2

Gene location (Human)
Chr.	Chromosome 2 (human)
Band	2q23.1	Start	148,644,440 bp
Band	2q23.1	End	148,787,569 bp

Gene location (Mouse)
Chr.	Chromosome 2 (mouse)
Band	2 C1.1|2 28.62 cM	Start	49,341,498 bp
Band	2 C1.1|2 28.62 cM	End	49,441,960 bp
RNA expression pattern
Bgee	Human / Mouse (ortholog); Top expressed in: germinal epithelium; Achilles tendon; ganglionic eminence; ventricular zone; endothelial cell; sural nerve; bone marrow cell; corpus callosum; amniotic fluid; monocyte / Top expressed in: hand; substantia nigra; ureter; zygote; lobe of cerebellum; cerebellar vermis; medullary collecting duct; fossa; lateral septal nucleus; ventromedial nucleus; More reference expression data
BioGPS	n/a
Gene ontology
Molecular function	histone acetyltransferase activity
Cellular component	nucleus; NuA4 histone acetyltransferase complex; Piccolo NuA4 histone acetyltransferase complex
Biological process	regulation of transcription, DNA-templated; transcription, DNA-templated; cellular response to DNA damage stimulus; DNA repair; regulation of transcription by RNA polymerase II; histone acetylation; chromatin organization
Sources:Amigo / QuickGO
Orthologs
Databases	NCBI: entry; OMA: entry
Species	Human	Mouse
Entrez	26122	227867
Ensembl	ENSG00000135999	ENSMUSG00000069495
UniProt	Q52LR7	Q8C0I4
RefSeq (mRNA)	NM_015630	NM_172663
RefSeq (protein)	NP_056445	NP_766251
Location (UCSC)	Chr 2: 148.64 – 148.79 Mb	Chr 2: 49.34 – 49.44 Mb
PubMed search
- Wikidata
View/Edit Human	View/Edit Mouse

Enhancer of polycomb homolog 2 is a protein that in humans is encoded by the EPC2 gene.

== Function ==
Predicted to enable protein-macromolecule adaptor activity. Involved in positive regulation of double-strand break repair via homologous recombination and regulation of cell cycle. Predicted to be located in nucleus. Predicted to be part of NuA4 histone acetyltransferase complex and piccolo histone acetyltransferase complex.
