= MPHOSPH10 =

Protein-coding gene in the species Homo sapiens

Identifiers
- Aliases: MPHOSPH10, CT90, MPP10, MPP10P, PPP1R106, M-phase phosphoprotein 10
- External IDs: OMIM: 605503; MGI: 1915223; GeneCards: MPHOSPH10

Gene location (Human)
Chr.	Chromosome 2 (human)
Band	2p13.3	Start	71,130,310 bp
Band	2p13.3	End	71,150,101 bp

Gene location (Mouse)
Chr.	Chromosome 7 (mouse)
Band	7|7 C	Start	64,026,275 bp
Band	7|7 C	End	64,042,016 bp
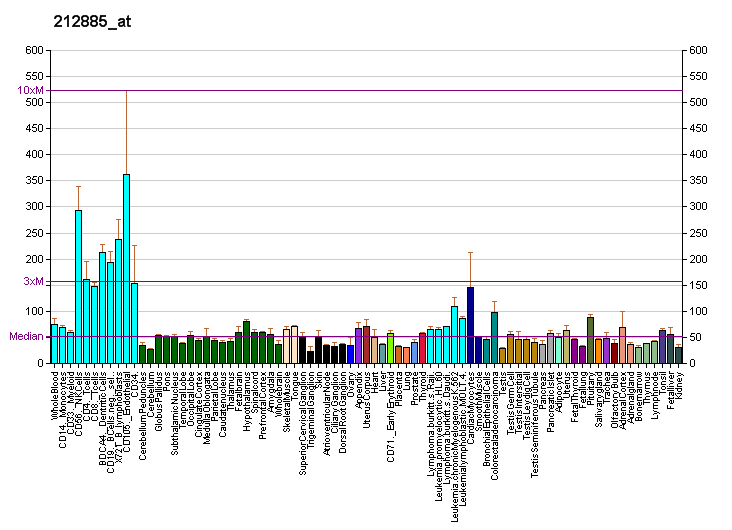
RNA expression pattern
Bgee	Human / Mouse (ortholog); Top expressed in: Achilles tendon; tendon of biceps brachii; endometrium; mucosa of esophagus; oral cavity; pars compacta; glutes; pericardium; hair follicle; mucosa of pharynx / Top expressed in: genital tubercle; zygote; tail of embryo; secondary oocyte; primary oocyte; epiblast; primitive streak; fetal liver hematopoietic progenitor cell; morula; morula; More reference expression data
BioGPS	More reference expression data
Gene ontology
Molecular function	protein binding; RNA binding
Cellular component	sno(s)RNA-containing ribonucleoprotein complex; small-subunit processome; Mpp10 complex; nucleolus; nucleus; chromosome; nucleoplasm
Biological process	RNA splicing, via transesterification reactions; negative regulation of phosphatase activity; RNA processing; ribosome biogenesis; RNA splicing; rRNA processing; maturation of SSU-rRNA
Sources:Amigo / QuickGO
Orthologs
Databases	NCBI: entry; OMA: entry
Species	Human	Mouse
Entrez	10199	67973
Ensembl	ENSG00000124383	ENSMUSG00000030521
UniProt	O00566	Q810V0
RefSeq (mRNA)	NM_005791	NM_026483
RefSeq (protein)	NP_005782	NP_080759
Location (UCSC)	Chr 2: 71.13 – 71.15 Mb	Chr 7: 64.03 – 64.04 Mb
PubMed search
- Wikidata
View/Edit Human	View/Edit Mouse

U3 small nucleolar ribonucleoprotein protein MPP10 is a protein that in humans is encoded by the MPHOSPH10 gene.

This gene encodes a protein that is phosphorylated during mitosis. The protein localizes to the nucleolus during interphase and to the chromosomes during M phase. The protein is thought to be part of the U3 small nucleolar ribonucleoprotein complex, which is involved in rRNA processing.
