= UBXN4 =

Protein-coding gene in humans

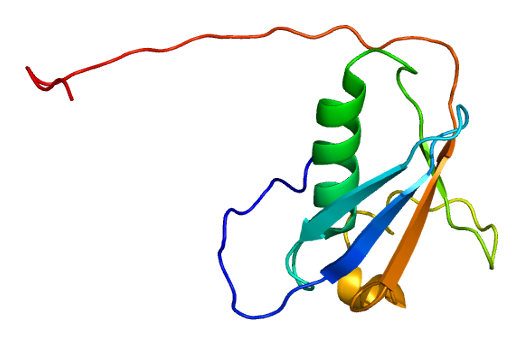

Identifiers
- Aliases: UBXN4, UBXD2, UBXDC1, erasin, UBX domain protein 4
- External IDs: OMIM: 611216; MGI: 1915062; GeneCards: UBXN4
Available structures
PDB	Ortholog search: PDBe RCSB
PDB	List of PDB id codes 2KXJ

Gene location (Human)
Chr.	Chromosome 2 (human)
Band	2q21.3	Start	135,741,734 bp
Band	2q21.3	End	135,785,056 bp

Gene location (Mouse)
Chr.	Chromosome 1 (mouse)
Band	1|1 E3	Start	128,171,701 bp
Band	1|1 E3	End	128,207,115 bp
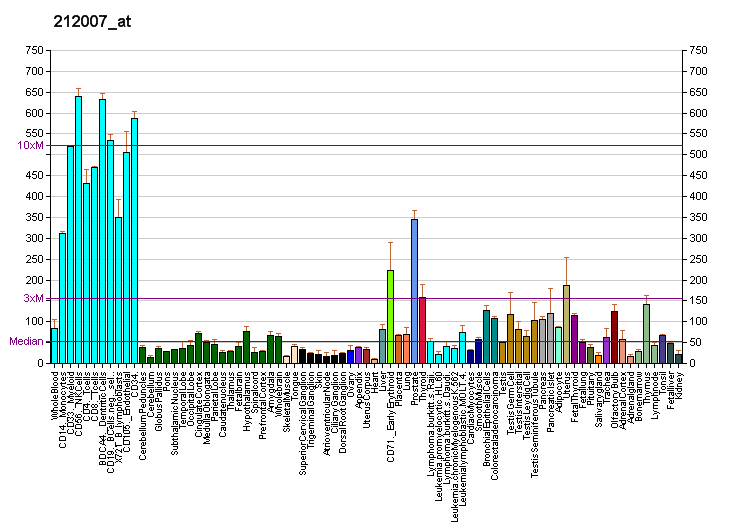

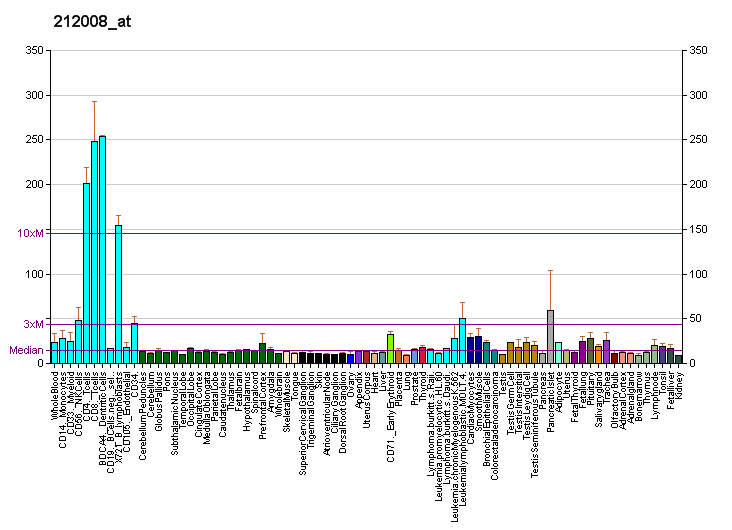

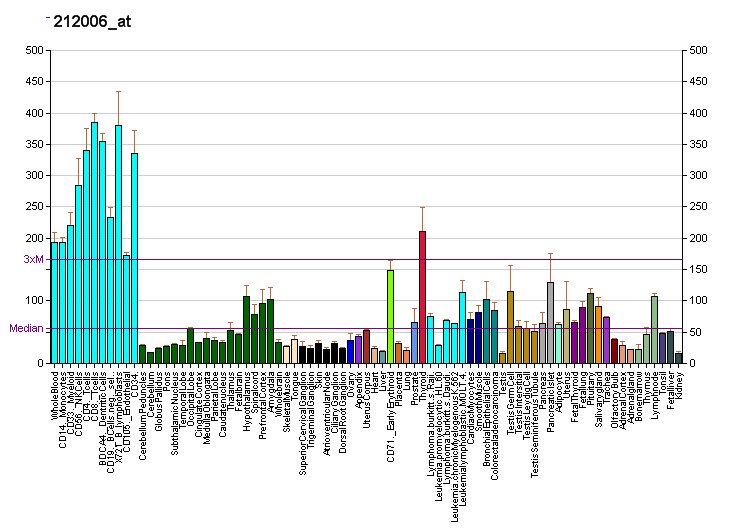
RNA expression pattern
Bgee	Human / Mouse (ortholog); Top expressed in: sperm; pylorus; cardia; secondary oocyte; optic nerve; seminal vesicula; body of pancreas; nipple; endometrium; corpus epididymis / Top expressed in: lacrimal gland; Rostral migratory stream; left lobe of liver; tail of embryo; supraoptic nucleus; prostate; salivary gland; lobe of prostate; seminal vesicula; retinal pigment epithelium; More reference expression data
BioGPS	More reference expression data
Gene ontology
Molecular function	protein binding
Cellular component	nuclear envelope; endoplasmic reticulum; endoplasmic reticulum membrane; nucleus; membrane; cytosol
Biological process	response to unfolded protein; ubiquitin-dependent ERAD pathway
Sources:Amigo / QuickGO
Orthologs
Databases	NCBI: entry; OMA: entry
Species	Human	Mouse
Entrez	23190	67812
Ensembl	ENSG00000144224	ENSMUSG00000026353
UniProt	Q92575	Q8VCH8
RefSeq (mRNA)	NM_014607	NM_026390; NM_001356529
RefSeq (protein)	NP_055422	NP_080666; NP_001343458
Location (UCSC)	Chr 2: 135.74 – 135.79 Mb	Chr 1: 128.17 – 128.21 Mb
PubMed search
- Wikidata
View/Edit Human	View/Edit Mouse

UBX domain-containing protein 4 is a protein that in humans is encoded by the UBXN4 gene (previously UBXD2).
