= PELI1 =

Protein-coding gene in the species Homo sapiens

Identifiers
- Aliases: PELI1, pellino E3 ubiquitin protein ligase 1
- External IDs: OMIM: 614797; MGI: 1914495; GeneCards: PELI1
Enzyme activity
EC #	BRENDA	ExPASy	KEGG	MetaCyc
2.3.2.27	↗	↗	↗	↗

Gene location (Human)
Chr.	Chromosome 2 (human)
Band	2p14	Start	64,092,652 bp
Band	2p14	End	64,144,420 bp

Gene location (Mouse)
Chr.	Chromosome 11 (mouse)
Band	11 A3.1|11 13.81 cM	Start	21,041,291 bp
Band	11 A3.1|11 13.81 cM	End	21,100,323 bp
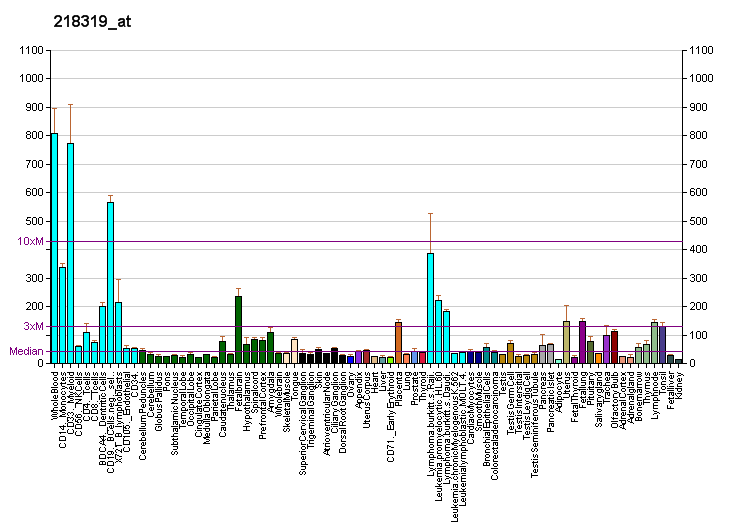
RNA expression pattern
Bgee	Human / Mouse (ortholog); Top expressed in: mucosa of paranasal sinus; cartilage tissue; mucosa of pharynx; amniotic fluid; skin of thigh; vena cava; oral cavity; human penis; bone marrow; epithelium of nasopharynx / Top expressed in: medial ganglionic eminence; blood; mesenteric lymph nodes; left lung lobe; transitional epithelium of urinary bladder; nucleus accumbens; skin of external ear; olfactory tubercle; Rostral migratory stream; anterior amygdaloid area; More reference expression data
BioGPS	More reference expression data
Gene ontology
Molecular function	ubiquitin-protein transferase activity; protein binding; ubiquitin-ubiquitin ligase activity; protein serine/threonine kinase activity; transferase activity; ubiquitin protein ligase activity
Cellular component	cytosol; nucleus
Biological process	response to dsRNA; positive regulation of toll-like receptor 3 signaling pathway; positive regulation of cytokine production; protein polyubiquitination; negative regulation of T cell proliferation; response to lipopolysaccharide; positive regulation of B cell proliferation; protein ubiquitination; positive regulation of toll-like receptor 4 signaling pathway; positive regulation of I-kappaB kinase/NF-kappaB signaling; positive regulation of B cell activation; negative regulation of NF-kappaB transcription factor activity; positive regulation of protein ubiquitination; negative regulation of T cell activation; protein phosphorylation; immune response; Toll signaling pathway; protein K48-linked ubiquitination; interleukin-1-mediated signaling pathway; proteasome-mediated ubiquitin-dependent protein catabolic process; negative regulation of necroptotic process; protein K63-linked ubiquitination; regulation of Toll signaling pathway
Sources:Amigo / QuickGO
Orthologs
Databases	NCBI: entry; OMA: entry
Species	Human	Mouse
Entrez	57162	67245
Ensembl	ENSG00000197329	ENSMUSG00000020134
UniProt	Q96FA3	Q8C669
RefSeq (mRNA)	NM_020651	NM_023324
RefSeq (protein)	NP_065702	NP_075813
Location (UCSC)	Chr 2: 64.09 – 64.14 Mb	Chr 11: 21.04 – 21.1 Mb
PubMed search
- Wikidata
View/Edit Human	View/Edit Mouse

Protein pellino homolog 1 is a protein that in humans is encoded by the PELI1 gene.
