= TUBA4B =

Protein in the species Homo sapiens

Identifiers
- Aliases: TUBA4B, TUBA4, tubulin alpha 4b
- External IDs: GeneCards: TUBA4B

Gene location (Human)
Chr.	Chromosome 2 (human)
Band	2q35	Start	219,253,243 bp
Band	2q35	End	219,272,197 bp
RNA expression pattern
Bgee	Human / Mouse (ortholog); Top expressed in: right uterine tube; epithelium of bronchus; bronchial epithelial cell; oocyte; epithelium of nasopharynx; nasal epithelium; mucosa of paranasal sinus; secondary oocyte; olfactory zone of nasal mucosa; muscle of trunk / n/a; More reference expression data
BioGPS	n/a
Orthologs
Databases	NCBI: entry; OMA: entry
Species	Human	Mouse
Entrez	80086	n/a
Ensembl	ENSG00000243910	n/a
UniProt	n a	n/a
RefSeq (mRNA)	NM_001355221	n/a
RefSeq (protein)	n/a	n/a
Location (UCSC)	Chr 2: 219.25 – 219.27 Mb	n/a
PubMed search		n/a
- Wikidata
View/Edit Human

Tubulin alpha 4b is a protein that in humans is encoded by the TUBA4B gene.
