= Testis specific 10 =

Protein-coding gene in the species Homo sapiens

TSGA10

Identifiers
- Aliases: TSGA10, CEP4L, CT79, testis specific 10, SPGF26
- External IDs: OMIM: 607166; MGI: 2685063; HomoloGene: 23531; GeneCards: TSGA10; OMA:TSGA10 - orthologs

Gene location (Human)
| Chr. | Chromosome 2 (human) |
| Band | 2q11.2 | Start | 98,997,261 bp |
| Band | 2q11.2 | End | 99,154,964 bp |

Gene location (Mouse)
| Chr. | Chromosome 1 (mouse) |
| Band | 1|1 B | Start | 37,793,857 bp |
| Band | 1|1 B | End | 37,905,510 bp |
RNA expression pattern
| Bgee | Human / Mouse (ortholog); Top expressed in: sperm; right uterine tube; bronchial epithelial cell; left testis; right testis; testicle; buccal mucosa cell; olfactory zone of nasal mucosa; gonad; anterior pituitary / Top expressed in: spermatid; spermatocyte; lumbar spinal ganglion; zygote; superior cervical ganglion; secondary oocyte; medial ganglionic eminence; tail of embryo; hand; tibialis anterior muscle; More reference expression data |
| BioGPS | n/a |
Gene ontology
| Molecular function | protein binding; molecular function |
| Cellular component | cytoplasm; neuron projection; motile cilium; nuclear membrane; membrane; nucleus; cellular component; centriole; cytoskeleton |
| Biological process | cell projection assembly; spermatogenesis |
Sources:Amigo / QuickGO
Orthologs
| Species | Human | Mouse |
| Entrez | 80705 | 211484 |
| Ensembl | ENSG00000135951 | ENSMUSG00000060771 |
| UniProt | Q9BZW7 | Q6NY15 |
| RefSeq (mRNA) | NM_025244; NM_182911; NM_001349012; NM_001349013; NM_001349014 | NM_001290720; NM_001290721; NM_207228 |
| RefSeq (protein) | NP_079520; NP_878915; NP_001335941; NP_001335942; NP_001335943 | NP_001277649; NP_001277650; NP_997111 |
| Location (UCSC) | Chr 2: 99 – 99.15 Mb | Chr 1: 37.79 – 37.91 Mb |
| PubMed search |
- Wikidata
| View/Edit Human | View/Edit Mouse |

Testis specific 10 is a protein that in humans is encoded by the TSGA10 gene.
