= SP140 nuclear body protein like =

Protein-coding gene in the species Homo sapiens

SP140L

Identifiers
- Aliases: SP140L, SP140 nuclear body protein like
- External IDs: OMIM: 617747; GeneCards: SP140L
Available structures
PDB	Human UniProt search: PDBe RCSB
PDB	List of PDB id codes 2MD7, 2MD8

Gene location (Human)
Chr.	Chromosome 2 (human)
Band	2q37.1	Start	230,327,184 bp
Band	2q37.1	End	230,403,732 bp
RNA expression pattern
Bgee	Human / Mouse (ortholog); Top expressed in: granulocyte; spleen; lymph node; appendix; monocyte; buccal mucosa cell; rectum; blood; gallbladder; upper lobe of left lung / n/a; More reference expression data
BioGPS	n/a
Gene ontology
Molecular function	metal ion binding; DNA binding; DNA-binding transcription factor activity, RNA polymerase II-specific
Cellular component	nucleus; nuclear body
Biological process	regulation of transcription by RNA polymerase II
Sources:Amigo / QuickGO
Orthologs
Databases	NCBI: entry; OMA: entry
Species	Human	Mouse
Entrez	93349	n/a
Ensembl	ENSG00000185404	n/a
UniProt	Q9H930	n/a
RefSeq (mRNA)	NM_001308162; NM_001308163; NM_138402; NM_001352892; NM_001352893 NM_001352894	n/a
RefSeq (protein)	NP_001295091; NP_001295092; NP_612411; NP_001339821; NP_001339822 NP_001339823	n/a
Location (UCSC)	Chr 2: 230.33 – 230.4 Mb	n/a
PubMed search		n/a
- Wikidata
View/Edit Human

SP140 nuclear body protein like is a protein that in humans is encoded by the SP140L gene.
