= POLR1B =

Protein-coding gene in the species Homo sapiens

Identifiers
- Aliases: POLR1B, RPA135, RPA2, Rpo1-2, polymerase (RNA) I subunit B, RNA polymerase I subunit B, A135, TCS4
- External IDs: OMIM: 602000; MGI: 108014; GeneCards: POLR1B
Enzyme activity
EC #	BRENDA	ExPASy	KEGG	MetaCyc
2.7.7.6	↗	↗	↗	↗

Gene location (Human)
Chr.	Chromosome 2 (human)
Band	2q14.1	Start	112,541,915 bp
Band	2q14.1	End	112,579,818 bp

Gene location (Mouse)
Chr.	Chromosome 2 (mouse)
Band	2|2 F1	Start	128,942,915 bp
Band	2|2 F1	End	128,968,514 bp
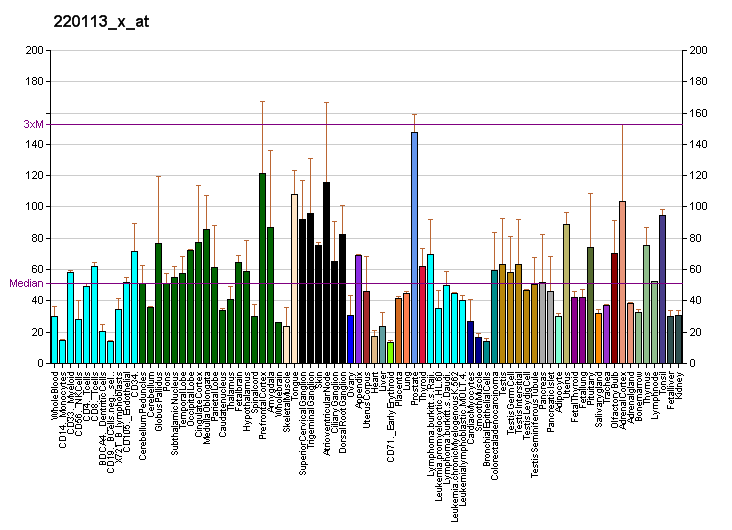
RNA expression pattern
Bgee	Human / Mouse (ortholog); Top expressed in: buccal mucosa cell; sperm; mucosa of paranasal sinus; endothelial cell; superficial temporal artery; nipple; ventral tegmental area; renal medulla; cardia; superior surface of tongue / Top expressed in: Ileal epithelium; blastocyst; primitive streak; morula; epiblast; tail of embryo; yolk sac; ventricular zone; embryo; Paneth cell; More reference expression data
BioGPS	More reference expression data
Gene ontology
Molecular function	transferase activity; DNA binding; nucleotidyltransferase activity; ribonucleoside binding; metal ion binding; DNA-directed 5'-3' RNA polymerase activity; protein binding; RNA polymerase I activity
Cellular component	nucleoplasm; nucleolus; RNA polymerase I complex; nucleus; cytosol
Biological process	termination of RNA polymerase I transcription; epigenetic maintenance of chromatin in transcription-competent conformation; transcription initiation from RNA polymerase I promoter; rRNA transcription; transcription, DNA-templated; embryo implantation; nucleologenesis; transcription elongation from RNA polymerase I promoter
Sources:Amigo / QuickGO
Orthologs
Databases	NCBI: entry; OMA: entry
Species	Human	Mouse
Entrez	84172	20017
Ensembl	ENSG00000125630	ENSMUSG00000027395
UniProt	Q9H9Y6	P70700
RefSeq (mRNA)	NM_019014; NM_001137604; NM_001282772; NM_001282774; NM_001282776 NM_001282777; NM_001282779; NM_001371969; NM_001371970; NM_001371971	NM_009086
RefSeq (protein)	NP_001131076; NP_001269701; NP_001269703; NP_001269705; NP_001269706 NP_001269708; NP_061887; NP_001358898; NP_001358899; NP_001358900	NP_033112
Location (UCSC)	Chr 2: 112.54 – 112.58 Mb	Chr 2: 128.94 – 128.97 Mb
PubMed search
- Wikidata
View/Edit Human	View/Edit Mouse

DNA-directed RNA polymerase I subunit RPA2 is an enzyme that in humans is encoded by the POLR1B gene.
