= Zinc finger protein 142 =

Protein found in humans

ZNF142

Identifiers
- Aliases: ZNF142, pHZ-49, zinc finger protein 142, HA4654, NEDISHM
- External IDs: OMIM: 604083; MGI: 1924514; GeneCards: ZNF142

Gene location (Human)
| Chr. | Chromosome 2 (human) |
| Band | 2q35 | Start | 218,633,329 bp |
| Band | 2q35 | End | 218,659,655 bp |

Gene location (Mouse)
| Chr. | Chromosome 1 (mouse) |
| Band | 1 C4|1 38.54 cM | Start | 74,604,286 bp |
| Band | 1 C4|1 38.54 cM | End | 74,627,405 bp |
RNA expression pattern
| Bgee | Human / Mouse (ortholog); Top expressed in: gonad; granulocyte; ganglionic eminence; ventricular zone; muscle of thigh; stromal cell of endometrium; gastrocnemius muscle; testicle; tendon of biceps brachii; right hemisphere of cerebellum / Top expressed in: zygote; secondary oocyte; tail of embryo; genital tubercle; condyle; Rostral migratory stream; primary oocyte; granulocyte; fossa; lumbar subsegment of spinal cord; More reference expression data |
| BioGPS | n/a |
Gene ontology
| Molecular function | DNA binding; metal ion binding; nucleic acid binding; molecular function; DNA-binding transcription factor activity, RNA polymerase II-specific |
| Cellular component | nucleus; cellular component |
| Biological process | regulation of transcription, DNA-templated; transcription, DNA-templated; biological process; regulation of transcription by RNA polymerase II |
Sources:Amigo / QuickGO
Orthologs
| Databases | NCBI: entry; OMA: entry |
| Species | Human | Mouse |
| Entrez | 7701 | 77264 |
| Ensembl | ENSG00000115568 | ENSMUSG00000026135 |
| UniProt | P52746 | G5E869 |
| RefSeq (mRNA) | NM_001105537; NM_001366287; NM_001366288; NM_001366289; NM_001366290 NM_001366291; NM_001367339; NM_001367340; NM_001367341; NM_001367342; NM_001379659; NM_001379660; NM_001379661; NM_001379662 | NM_029888; NM_001310668 |
| RefSeq (protein) | NP_001099007; NP_001353216; NP_001353217; NP_001353218; NP_001353219 NP_001353220; NP_001354268; NP_001354269; NP_001354270; NP_001354271; NP_001366588; NP_001366589; NP_001366590; NP_001366591 | NP_001297597; NP_084164 |
| Location (UCSC) | Chr 2: 218.63 – 218.66 Mb | Chr 1: 74.6 – 74.63 Mb |
| PubMed search |
- Wikidata
| View/Edit Human | View/Edit Mouse |

Zinc finger protein 142 is a protein that in humans is encoded by the ZNF142 gene.

== Function ==
The protein encoded by this gene belongs to the Kruppel family of C2H2-type zinc finger proteins. It contains 31 C2H2-type zinc fingers and may be involved in transcriptional regulation. Alternatively spliced transcript variants have been found for this gene.
