= Galectin-related protein =

Protein-coding gene in the species Homo sapiens

LGALSL
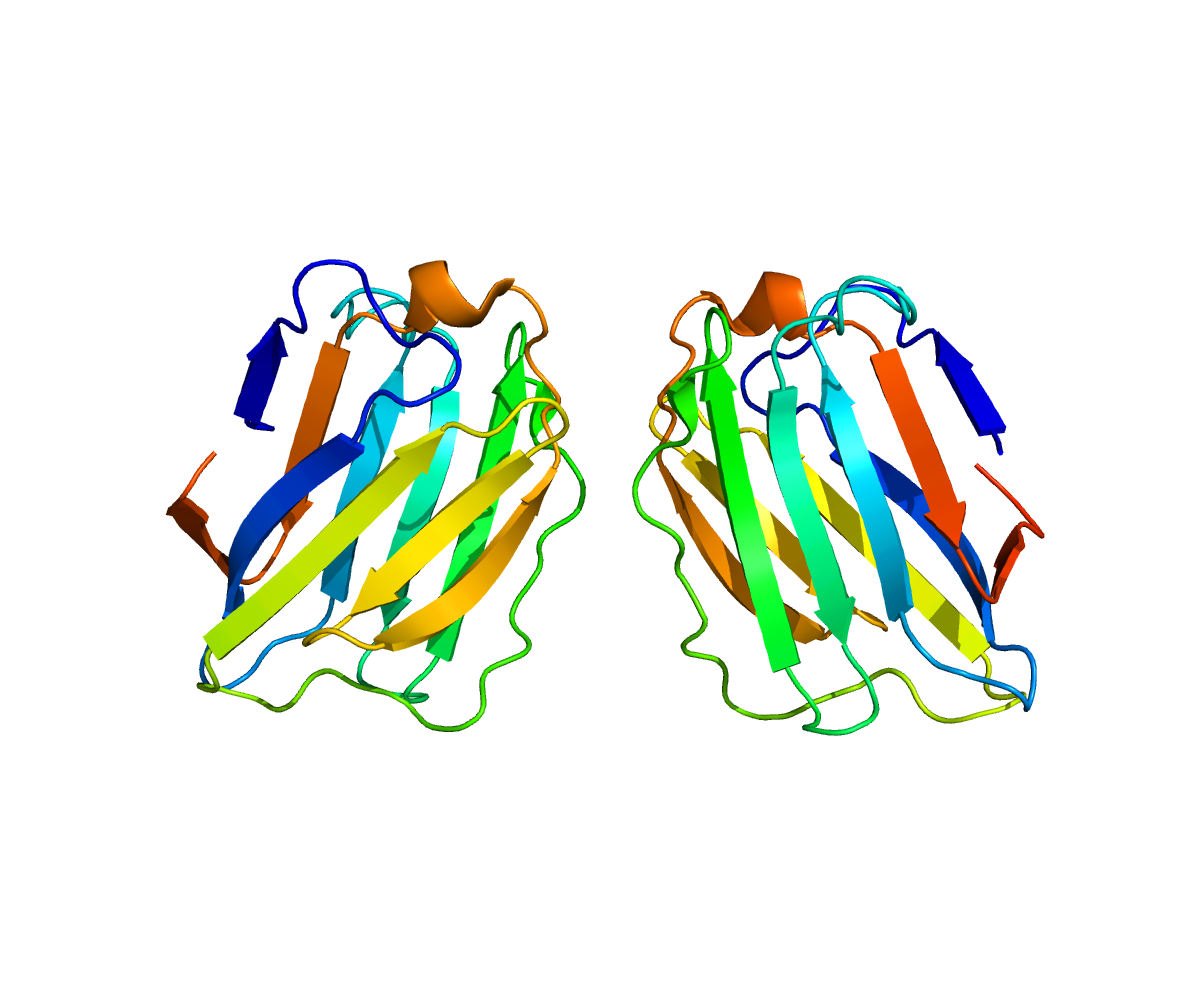

Identifiers
- Aliases: LGALSL, GRP, HSPC159, galectin like
- External IDs: OMIM: 617902; MGI: 1916114; GeneCards: LGALSL
Available structures
PDB	Ortholog search: PDBe RCSB
PDB	List of PDB id codes 2JJ6, 3B9C

Gene location (Human)
Chr.	Chromosome 2 (human)
Band	2p14	Start	64,453,969 bp
Band	2p14	End	64,461,381 bp

Gene location (Mouse)
Chr.	Chromosome 11 (mouse)
Band	11 A3.1|11 13.53 cM	Start	20,773,576 bp
Band	11 A3.1|11 13.53 cM	End	20,781,056 bp
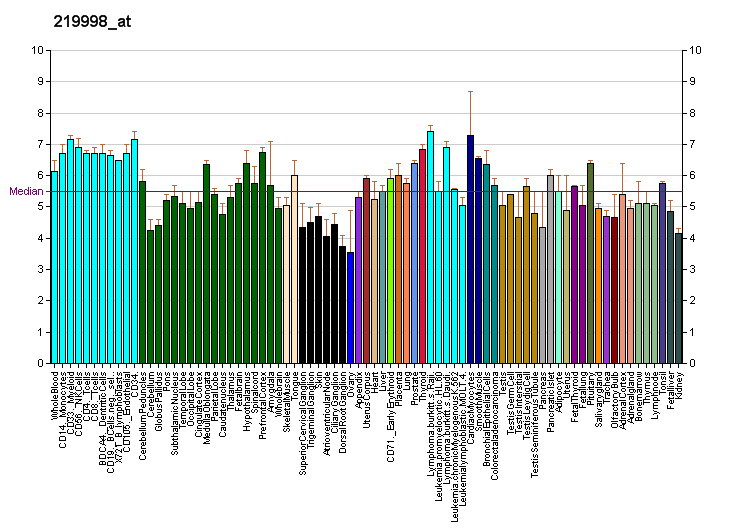
RNA expression pattern
Bgee	Human / Mouse (ortholog); Top expressed in: skin of thigh; skin of hip; gums; gingival epithelium; vulva; Skeletal muscle tissue of rectus abdominis; skin of abdomen; human penis; oral cavity; Skeletal muscle tissue of biceps brachii / Top expressed in: retinal pigment epithelium; hair follicle; skin of external ear; intercostal muscle; barrel cortex; skin of abdomen; pineal gland; vastus lateralis muscle; lobe of cerebellum; triceps brachii muscle; More reference expression data
BioGPS	More reference expression data
Orthologs
Databases	NCBI: entry; OMA: entry
Species	Human	Mouse
Entrez	29094	216551
Ensembl	ENSG00000119862	ENSMUSG00000042363
UniProt	Q3ZCW2	Q8VED9
RefSeq (mRNA)	NM_014181	NM_173752
RefSeq (protein)	NP_054900	NP_776113
Location (UCSC)	Chr 2: 64.45 – 64.46 Mb	Chr 11: 20.77 – 20.78 Mb
PubMed search
- Wikidata
View/Edit Human	View/Edit Mouse

Galectin-related protein is a protein which in humans is encoded by the gene LGALSL (previously HSPC159 or GRP). It is related to other galectin proteins, but unlike others, it does not bind to lactose, and may not bind to any carbohydrates due to changes in resides that are important for carbohydrate binding.
