= PCBP1-AS1 =

Non-coding RNA found in humans

Identifiers
- Aliases: PCBP1-AS1, PCBP1 antisense RNA 1
- External IDs: GeneCards: PCBP1-AS1

Gene location (Human)
Chr.	Chromosome 2 (human)
Band	2p13.3	Start	69,960,104 bp
Band	2p13.3	End	70,103,220 bp
RNA expression pattern
Bgee	Human / Mouse (ortholog); Top expressed in: sural nerve; epithelium of colon; bone marrow cell; testicle; right lobe of liver; ganglionic eminence; anterior pituitary; Achilles tendon; left ovary; right ovary / n/a; More reference expression data
BioGPS	n/a
Orthologs
Databases	NCBI: entry; OMA: entry
Species	Human	Mouse
Entrez	400960	n/a
Ensembl	ENSG00000179818	n/a
UniProt	n a	n/a
RefSeq (mRNA)	n/a	n/a
RefSeq (protein)	n/a	n/a
Location (UCSC)	Chr 2: 69.96 – 70.1 Mb	n/a
PubMed search		n/a
- Wikidata
View/Edit Human

PCBP1 antisense RNA 1 is a non-coding RNA that in humans is encoded by the PCBP1-AS1 gene.
