= Serine/threonine kinase 11 interacting protein =

Protein-coding gene in the species Homo sapiens

STK11IP

Identifiers
- Aliases: STK11IP, LIP1, LKB1IP, STK11IP1, serine/threonine kinase 11 interacting protein
- External IDs: OMIM: 607172; MGI: 1918978; GeneCards: STK11IP

Gene location (Human)
| Chr. | Chromosome 2 (human) |
| Band | 2q35 | Start | 219,597,857 bp |
| Band | 2q35 | End | 219,616,451 bp |

Gene location (Mouse)
| Chr. | Chromosome 1 (mouse) |
| Band | 1|1 C4 | Start | 75,498,173 bp |
| Band | 1|1 C4 | End | 75,513,979 bp |
RNA expression pattern
| Bgee | Human / Mouse (ortholog); Top expressed in: right testis; left testis; right uterine tube; left ovary; right ovary; tibial nerve; anterior pituitary; right hemisphere of cerebellum; granulocyte; right lobe of thyroid gland / Top expressed in: neural layer of retina; granulocyte; otic vesicle; lip; tail of embryo; yolk sac; muscle of thigh; genital tubercle; ventricular zone; spermatocyte; More reference expression data |
| BioGPS | n/a |
Gene ontology
| Molecular function | protein kinase binding; structural constituent of cytoskeleton |
| Cellular component | cytoplasm; lysosomal membrane; intracellular membrane-bounded organelle; extracellular region; azurophil granule lumen |
| Biological process | protein localization; neutrophil degranulation; cytoskeleton organization |
Sources:Amigo / QuickGO
Orthologs
| Databases | NCBI: entry; OMA: entry |
| Species | Human | Mouse |
| Entrez | 114790 | 71728 |
| Ensembl | ENSG00000144589 | ENSMUSG00000026213 |
| UniProt | Q8N1F8 | Q3TAA7 |
| RefSeq (mRNA) | NM_052902 | NM_027886 |
| RefSeq (protein) | NP_443134 | NP_082162 |
| Location (UCSC) | Chr 2: 219.6 – 219.62 Mb | Chr 1: 75.5 – 75.51 Mb |
| PubMed search |
- Wikidata
| View/Edit Human | View/Edit Mouse |

Serine/threonine kinase 11 interacting protein is a protein that in humans is encoded by the STK11IP gene.
