= Long intergenic non-protein coding RNA 607 =

LINC00607

Identifiers
- Aliases: LINC00607, long intergenic non-protein coding RNA 607
- External IDs: GeneCards: LINC00607; OMA:LINC00607 - orthologs

Gene location (Human)
Chr.	Chromosome 2 (human)
Band	2q35	Start	215,611,563 bp
Band	2q35	End	215,848,954 bp
RNA expression pattern
Bgee	Human / Mouse (ortholog); Top expressed in: buccal mucosa cell; testicle; right coronary artery; Descending thoracic aorta; ventricular zone; sural nerve; ascending aorta; left coronary artery; bone marrow cell; tibial arteries / n/a; More reference expression data
BioGPS	n/a
Orthologs
Species	Human	Mouse
Entrez	646324	n/a
Ensembl	ENSG00000235770	n/a
UniProt	n a	n/a
RefSeq (mRNA)	n/a	n/a
RefSeq (protein)	n/a	n/a
Location (UCSC)	Chr 2: 215.61 – 215.85 Mb	n/a
PubMed search		n/a
- Wikidata
View/Edit Human

Long intergenic non-protein coding RNA 607 is a protein that in humans is encoded by the LINC00607 gene.
