= SMPD4 =

Protein-coding gene in the species Homo sapiens

Identifiers
- Aliases: SMPD4, NET13, NSMASE-3, NSMASE3, sphingomyelin phosphodiesterase 4, SKNY, NEDMABA, NEDMEBA
- External IDs: OMIM: 610457; MGI: 1924876; HomoloGene: 9813; GeneCards: SMPD4; OMA:SMPD4 - orthologs

Gene location (Human)
| Chr. | Chromosome 2 (human) |
| Band | 2q21.1 | Start | 130,151,392 bp |
| Band | 2q21.1 | End | 130,182,750 bp |

Gene location (Mouse)
| Chr. | Chromosome 16 (mouse) |
| Band | 16|16 A3 | Start | 17,437,218 bp |
| Band | 16|16 A3 | End | 17,462,692 bp |
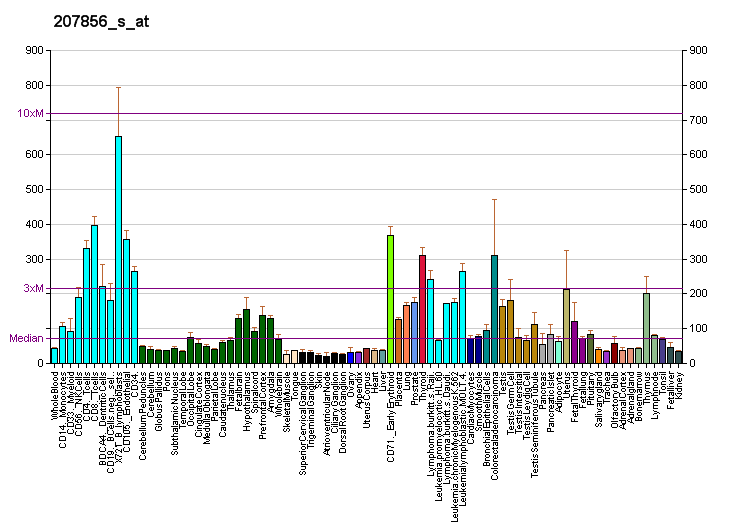
RNA expression pattern
| Bgee | Human / Mouse (ortholog); Top expressed in: pituitary gland; anterior pituitary; right hemisphere of cerebellum; left lobe of thyroid gland; canal of the cervix; right lobe of thyroid gland; apex of heart; body of uterus; right uterine tube; left ovary / Top expressed in: tail of embryo; otic vesicle; genital tubercle; otic placode; saccule; epiblast; spermatocyte; primary visual cortex; superior frontal gyrus; ventricular zone; More reference expression data |
| BioGPS | More reference expression data |
Gene ontology
| Molecular function | sphingomyelin phosphodiesterase activity; hydrolase activity; metal ion binding; sphingomyelin phosphodiesterase D activity |
| Cellular component | integral component of membrane; Golgi membrane; trans-Golgi network; Golgi apparatus; endoplasmic reticulum membrane; endoplasmic reticulum; membrane |
| Biological process | ceramide biosynthetic process; cellular response to tumor necrosis factor; sphingomyelin catabolic process; glycosphingolipid metabolic process; glycerophospholipid catabolic process; metabolism |
Sources:Amigo / QuickGO
Orthologs
| Species | Human | Mouse |
| Entrez | 55627 | 77626 |
| Ensembl | ENSG00000136699 | ENSMUSG00000005899 |
| UniProt | Q9NXE4 | Q6ZPR5 |
| RefSeq (mRNA) | NM_001171083; NM_001171084; NM_017751; NM_017951 | NM_001164609; NM_001164610; NM_001164611; NM_029945 |
| RefSeq (protein) | NP_001164554; NP_060221; NP_060421; NP_060421.2 | NP_001158081; NP_001158082; NP_001158083; NP_084221 |
| Location (UCSC) | Chr 2: 130.15 – 130.18 Mb | Chr 16: 17.44 – 17.46 Mb |
| PubMed search |
- Wikidata
| View/Edit Human | View/Edit Mouse |

Sphingomyelin phosphodiesterase 4 is an enzyme that in humans is encoded by the SMPD4 gene.
