= Transmembrane protein 182 =

Protein-coding gene in the species Homo sapiens

TMEM182

Identifiers
- Aliases: TMEM182, transmembrane protein 182
- External IDs: MGI: 1923725; HomoloGene: 44899; GeneCards: TMEM182; OMA:TMEM182 - orthologs

Gene location (Human)
| Chr. | Chromosome 2 (human) |
| Band | 2q12.1 | Start | 102,736,905 bp |
| Band | 2q12.1 | End | 103,019,900 bp |

Gene location (Mouse)
| Chr. | Chromosome 1 (mouse) |
| Band | 1|1 B | Start | 40,844,761 bp |
| Band | 1|1 B | End | 40,896,047 bp |
RNA expression pattern
| Bgee | Human / Mouse (ortholog); Top expressed in: cardiac muscle tissue of right atrium; myocardium of left ventricle; vastus lateralis muscle; Skeletal muscle tissue of rectus abdominis; right ventricle; biceps brachii; Skeletal muscle tissue of biceps brachii; deltoid muscle; muscle of thigh; right auricle of heart / Top expressed in: interventricular septum; knee joint; triceps brachii muscle; vastus lateralis muscle; medial head of gastrocnemius muscle; temporal muscle; digastric muscle; sternocleidomastoid muscle; extraocular muscle; tibialis anterior muscle; More reference expression data |
| BioGPS | n/a |
Orthologs
| Species | Human | Mouse |
| Entrez | 130827 | 381339 |
| Ensembl | ENSG00000170417 | ENSMUSG00000079588 |
| UniProt | Q6ZP80 | B2RVY9 |
| RefSeq (mRNA) | NM_144632; NM_001321343; NM_001321344; NM_001321345; NM_001321346 | NM_001081198 |
| RefSeq (protein) | NP_001308272; NP_001308273; NP_001308274; NP_001308275; NP_653233 | NP_001074667 |
| Location (UCSC) | Chr 2: 102.74 – 103.02 Mb | Chr 1: 40.84 – 40.9 Mb |
| PubMed search |
- Wikidata
| View/Edit Human | View/Edit Mouse |

Transmembrane protein 182 is a protein that in humans is encoded by the TMEM182 gene.
