= Zinc finger protein 2 =

Protein found in humans

ZNF2

Identifiers
- Aliases: ZNF2, A1-5, ZNF661, Zfp661, zinc finger protein 2
- External IDs: OMIM: 194500; MGI: 1919430; GeneCards: ZNF2

Gene location (Human)
| Chr. | Chromosome 2 (human) |
| Band | 2q11.1 | Start | 95,165,432 bp |
| Band | 2q11.1 | End | 95,184,317 bp |

Gene location (Mouse)
| Chr. | Chromosome 2 (mouse) |
| Band | 2|2 F1 | Start | 127,416,582 bp |
| Band | 2|2 F1 | End | 127,429,014 bp |
RNA expression pattern
| Bgee | Human / Mouse (ortholog); Top expressed in: testicle; secondary oocyte; endothelial cell; gonad; mucosa of ileum; pancreatic ductal cell; stromal cell of endometrium; granulocyte; islet of Langerhans; ganglionic eminence / Top expressed in: spermatocyte; urethra; male urethra; ventricular zone; tail of embryo; otic vesicle; muscle of thigh; genital tubercle; embryo; ganglionic eminence; More reference expression data |
| BioGPS | n/a |
Gene ontology
| Molecular function | protein binding; nucleic acid binding; zinc ion binding; DNA-binding transcription factor activity; metal ion binding; DNA binding; DNA-binding transcription factor activity, RNA polymerase II-specific |
| Cellular component | nucleus; intracellular anatomical structure |
| Biological process | regulation of transcription, DNA-templated; transcription, DNA-templated; regulation of transcription by RNA polymerase II |
Sources:Amigo / QuickGO
Orthologs
| Databases | NCBI: entry; OMA: entry |
| Species | Human | Mouse |
| Entrez | 7549 | 72180 |
| Ensembl | ENSG00000275111 | ENSMUSG00000034800 |
| UniProt | Q9BSG1 | Q8BIQ3 |
| RefSeq (mRNA) | NM_021088; NM_001017396; NM_001282398; NM_001291604; NM_001291605 | NM_001111029; NM_028141; NM_001355622; NM_001355623 |
| RefSeq (protein) | NP_001017396; NP_001269327; NP_001278533; NP_001278534; NP_066574 | NP_001104499; NP_082417; NP_001342551; NP_001342552 |
| Location (UCSC) | Chr 2: 95.17 – 95.18 Mb | Chr 2: 127.42 – 127.43 Mb |
| PubMed search |
- Wikidata
| View/Edit Human | View/Edit Mouse |

Zinc finger protein 2 is a protein that in humans is encoded by the ZNF2 gene.

== Function ==
The protein encoded by this gene belongs to the C2H2-type zinc-finger protein family. The exact function of this gene is not known, however, zinc-finger proteins are known to interact with DNA and function as transcription regulators. Alternatively spliced transcript variants encoding different isoforms have been found for this gene.
