= SH3 and SYLF domain containing 1 =

Protein-coding gene in the species Homo sapiens

SH3YL1

Identifiers
- Aliases: SH3YL1, RAY, SH3 and SYLF domain containing 1
- External IDs: OMIM: 617314; MGI: 1346118; GeneCards: SH3YL1
Available structures
PDB	Ortholog search: PDBe RCSB
PDB	List of PDB id codes 2D8H

Gene location (Human)
Chr.	Chromosome 2 (human)
Band	2p25.3	Start	217,730 bp
Band	2p25.3	End	266,398 bp

Gene location (Mouse)
Chr.	Chromosome 12 (mouse)
Band	12|12 A2	Start	30,961,667 bp
Band	12|12 A2	End	31,010,161 bp
RNA expression pattern
Bgee	Human / Mouse (ortholog); Top expressed in: kidney tubule; parotid gland; skin of thigh; body of pancreas; hair follicle; palpebral conjunctiva; mucosa of colon; mucosa of sigmoid colon; jejunal mucosa; oral cavity / Top expressed in: seminal vesicula; epithelium of stomach; transitional epithelium of urinary bladder; saccule; pyloric antrum; fetal liver hematopoietic progenitor cell; otic placode; conjunctival fornix; prostate; secondary oocyte; More reference expression data
BioGPS	n/a
Gene ontology
Molecular function	phosphatase binding; protein binding; phosphatidylinositol binding
Cellular component	ruffle membrane
Biological process	phosphatidylinositol biosynthetic process; regulation of ruffle assembly
Sources:Amigo / QuickGO
Orthologs
Databases	NCBI: entry; OMA: entry
Species	Human	Mouse
Entrez	26751	24057
Ensembl	ENSG00000035115	ENSMUSG00000020669
UniProt	Q96HL8	O08641
RefSeq (mRNA)	NM_001159597; NM_001282682; NM_001282687; NM_015677	NM_001289480; NM_013709
RefSeq (protein)	NP_001153069; NP_001269611; NP_001269616; NP_056492	NP_001276409; NP_038737
Location (UCSC)	Chr 2: 0.22 – 0.27 Mb	Chr 12: 30.96 – 31.01 Mb
PubMed search
- Wikidata
View/Edit Human	View/Edit Mouse

SH3 and SYLF domain containing 1 is a protein that in humans is encoded by the SH3YL1 gene.
