= Augurin =

Protein found in humans

ECRG4

Identifiers
- Aliases: ECRG4, chromosome 2 open reading frame 40, C2orf40, UNQ761/PRO1508, ECRG4 augurin precursor
- External IDs: OMIM: 611752; MGI: 1926146; GeneCards: ECRG4

Gene location (Human)
Chr.	Chromosome 2 (human)
Band	2q12.2	Start	106,063,246 bp
Band	2q12.2	End	106,078,155 bp

Gene location (Mouse)
Chr.	Chromosome 1 (mouse)
Band	1|1 C1.1	Start	43,769,762 bp
Band	1|1 C1.1	End	43,781,738 bp
RNA expression pattern
Bgee	Human / Mouse (ortholog); Top expressed in: gastric mucosa; bronchial epithelial cell; synovial membrane; cartilage tissue; right coronary artery; tibia; synovial joint; trachea; left coronary artery; spinal ganglia / Top expressed in: Epithelium of choroid plexus; adrenal gland; calvaria; vestibular sensory epithelium; epithelium of lens; intercostal muscle; tibiofemoral joint; ankle; condyle; aortic valve; More reference expression data
BioGPS	n/a
Gene ontology
Molecular function	neuropeptide hormone activity
Cellular component	extracellular region; transport vesicle; cytoplasmic vesicle; extracellular space; dense core granule; cytoplasm; apical plasma membrane; plasma membrane; membrane
Biological process	cellular senescence; G1 to G0 transition; anaphase-promoting complex-dependent catabolic process; neuropeptide signaling pathway; central nervous system development; negative regulation of cell population proliferation; response to wounding; vasopressin secretion; positive regulation of corticotropin secretion; positive regulation of corticotropin-releasing hormone secretion; positive regulation of corticosterone secretion; regulation of signaling receptor activity
Sources:Amigo / QuickGO
Orthologs
Databases	NCBI: entry; OMA: entry
Species	Human	Mouse
Entrez	84417	78896
Ensembl	ENSG00000119147	ENSMUSG00000026051
UniProt	Q9H1Z8	Q99LS0
RefSeq (mRNA)	NM_032411	NM_024283
RefSeq (protein)	NP_115787; NP_115787	NP_077245
Location (UCSC)	Chr 2: 106.06 – 106.08 Mb	Chr 1: 43.77 – 43.78 Mb
PubMed search
- Wikidata
View/Edit Human	View/Edit Mouse

Augurin is a protein that in humans is encoded by the ECRG4 gene (previously C2orf40).
