= DHX57 =

Protein-coding gene in the species Homo sapiens

Identifiers
- Aliases: DHX57, DDX57, DEAH-box helicase 57, DExH-box helicase 57
- External IDs: MGI: 2147067; GeneCards: DHX57
Enzyme activity
EC #	BRENDA	ExPASy	KEGG	MetaCyc
3.6.4.13	↗	↗	↗	↗

Gene location (Human)
Chr.	Chromosome 2 (human)
Band	2p22.1	Start	38,797,729 bp
Band	2p22.1	End	38,875,934 bp

Gene location (Mouse)
Chr.	Chromosome 17 (mouse)
Band	17|17 E3	Start	80,238,309 bp
Band	17|17 E3	End	80,290,476 bp
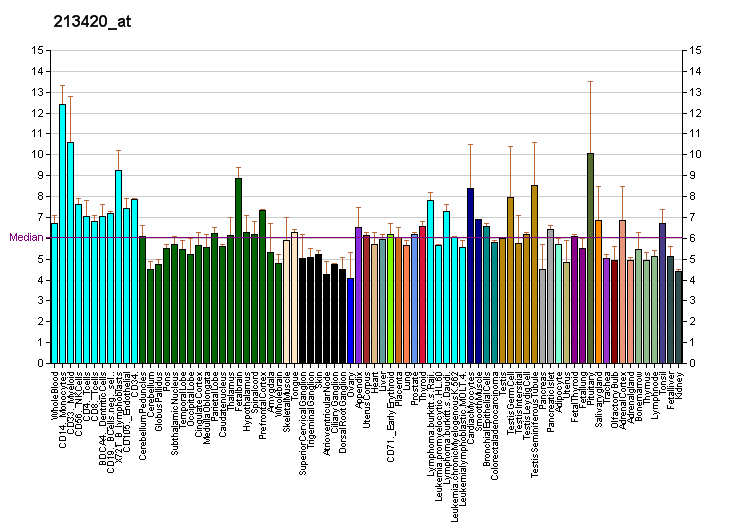
RNA expression pattern
Bgee	Human / Mouse (ortholog); Top expressed in: sperm; buccal mucosa cell; right testis; left testis; ventricular zone; ganglionic eminence; tendon of biceps brachii; anterior pituitary; monocyte; tibia / Top expressed in: saccule; otic vesicle; otic placode; zygote; secondary oocyte; tail of embryo; genital tubercle; primary oocyte; spinal ganglia; lumbar spinal ganglion; More reference expression data
BioGPS	More reference expression data
Gene ontology
Molecular function	nucleotide binding; protein binding; hydrolase activity; ATP binding; helicase activity; metal ion binding; nucleic acid binding; RNA binding; 3'-5' RNA helicase activity
Cellular component	mitochondrion
Biological process	RNA processing
Sources:Amigo / QuickGO
Orthologs
Databases	NCBI: entry; OMA: entry
Species	Human	Mouse
Entrez	90957	106794
Ensembl	ENSG00000163214	ENSMUSG00000035051
UniProt	Q6P158; Q8N4U2	Q6P5D3
RefSeq (mRNA)	NM_198963; NM_001329963; NM_144995; NM_145646	NM_001163759; NM_198942
RefSeq (protein)	NP_001316892; NP_945314; NP_945314.1	NP_001157231; NP_945180
Location (UCSC)	Chr 2: 38.8 – 38.88 Mb	Chr 17: 80.24 – 80.29 Mb
PubMed search
- Wikidata
View/Edit Human	View/Edit Mouse

Putative ATP-dependent RNA helicase DHX57 is an enzyme that in humans is encoded by the DHX57 gene.
