= CFAP36 =

Protein found in humans

Identifiers
- Aliases: CFAP36, CCDC104, BARTL1, cilia and flagella associated protein 36
- External IDs: MGI: 1913994; GeneCards: CFAP36

Gene location (Human)
Chr.	Chromosome 2 (human)
Band	2p16.1	Start	55,519,604 bp
Band	2p16.1	End	55,545,079 bp

Gene location (Mouse)
Chr.	Chromosome 11 (mouse)
Band	11|11 A3.3	Start	29,171,532 bp
Band	11|11 A3.3	End	29,197,409 bp
RNA expression pattern
Bgee	Human / Mouse (ortholog); Top expressed in: left testis; anterior pituitary; right testis; right uterine tube; Achilles tendon; Brodmann area 9; nucleus accumbens; hypothalamus; right frontal lobe; cingulate gyrus / Top expressed in: seminiferous tubule; olfactory epithelium; anterior horn of spinal cord; spermatid; supraoptic nucleus; amygdala; medial ganglionic eminence; Epithelium of choroid plexus; spermatocyte; pineal gland; More reference expression data
BioGPS	n/a
Gene ontology
Molecular function	protein binding; protein N-terminus binding
Cellular component	cytoplasm; nucleus; cell projection; ciliary transition zone; ciliary base; motile cilium; cilium
Biological process	biological process
Sources:Amigo / QuickGO
Orthologs
Databases	NCBI: entry; OMA: entry
Species	Human	Mouse
Entrez	112942	216618
Ensembl	ENSG00000163001	ENSMUSG00000020462
UniProt	Q96G28	Q8C6E0
RefSeq (mRNA)	NM_001282761; NM_080667	NM_025740
RefSeq (protein)	NP_001269690; NP_542398	NP_080016
Location (UCSC)	Chr 2: 55.52 – 55.55 Mb	Chr 11: 29.17 – 29.2 Mb
PubMed search
- Wikidata
View/Edit Human	View/Edit Mouse

Cilia- and flagella-associated protein 36 is a protein that in humans is encoded by the CFAP36 gene (previously CCDC104). Not much has been reported about this protein, but it is located in the ciliary transition area in a cell.
