= SLC35F6 =

Protein-coding gene in the species Homo sapiens

Identifiers
- Aliases: SLC35F6, ANT2BP, C2orf18, TANGO9, solute carrier family 35 member F6
- External IDs: MGI: 1922169; HomoloGene: 9896; GeneCards: SLC35F6; OMA:SLC35F6 - orthologs

Gene location (Human)
Chr.	Chromosome 2 (human)
Band	2p23.3	Start	26,764,284 bp
Band	2p23.3	End	26,781,231 bp

Gene location (Mouse)
Chr.	Chromosome 5 (mouse)
Band	5|5 B1	Start	30,805,277 bp
Band	5|5 B1	End	30,817,073 bp
RNA expression pattern
Bgee	Human / Mouse (ortholog); Top expressed in: nipple; decidua; mucosa of pharynx; pericardium; superior surface of tongue; saphenous vein; gingival epithelium; body of tongue; vena cava; oral cavity / Top expressed in: interventricular septum; yolk sac; epithelium of small intestine; lip; epithelium of stomach; granulocyte; myocardium of ventricle; stroma of bone marrow; spermatocyte; decidua; More reference expression data
BioGPS	n/a
Gene ontology
Molecular function	protein binding; transmembrane transporter activity
Cellular component	integral component of membrane; lysosomal membrane; lysosome; extracellular exosome; membrane; mitochondrion; nucleoplasm; cytosol; intracellular membrane-bounded organelle
Biological process	negative regulation of mitochondrial outer membrane permeabilization involved in apoptotic signaling pathway; positive regulation of cell population proliferation; transport; transmembrane transport
Sources:Amigo / QuickGO
Orthologs
Species	Human	Mouse
Entrez	54978	74919
Ensembl	ENSG00000213699	ENSMUSG00000029175
UniProt	Q8N357	Q8VE96
RefSeq (mRNA)	NM_017877	NM_175675
RefSeq (protein)	NP_060347	NP_783606
Location (UCSC)	Chr 2: 26.76 – 26.78 Mb	Chr 5: 30.81 – 30.82 Mb
PubMed search
- Wikidata
View/Edit Human	View/Edit Mouse

SLC35F6 is a protein that in humans is encoded by the SLC35F6 gene. The orthologue in mice is 4930471M23Rik.
