= NEURL3 =

Protein-coding gene in the species Homo sapiens

Identifiers
- Aliases: NEURL3, LINCR, neuralized E3 ubiquitin protein ligase 3, RNF132
- External IDs: OMIM: 617206; MGI: 2429944; GeneCards: NEURL3
Enzyme activity
EC #	BRENDA	ExPASy	KEGG	MetaCyc
2.3.2.27	↗	↗	↗	↗

Gene location (Human)
Chr.	Chromosome 2 (human)
Band	2q11.2	Start	96,497,646 bp
Band	2q11.2	End	96,508,109 bp

Gene location (Mouse)
Chr.	Chromosome 1 (mouse)
Band	1|1 B	Start	36,303,678 bp
Band	1|1 B	End	36,313,760 bp
RNA expression pattern
Bgee	Human / Mouse (ortholog); Top expressed in: nasal epithelium; olfactory zone of nasal mucosa; pancreatic epithelial cell; parotid gland; body of pancreas; cartilage tissue; islet of Langerhans; human kidney; minor salivary glands; trachea / Top expressed in: granulocyte; duodenum; jejunum; Paneth cell; colon; bone marrow; spleen; mesenteric lymph nodes; ganglion of vagus nerve; stomach; More reference expression data
BioGPS	n/a
Orthologs
Databases	NCBI: entry; OMA: entry
Species	Human	Mouse
Entrez	93082	214854
Ensembl	ENSG00000163121	ENSMUSG00000047180
UniProt	Q96EH8	Q8CJC5
RefSeq (mRNA)	NM_001080535; NM_001285485; NM_001285486	NM_153408
RefSeq (protein)	NP_001272414; NP_001272415	NP_700457
Location (UCSC)	Chr 2: 96.5 – 96.51 Mb	Chr 1: 36.3 – 36.31 Mb
PubMed search
- Wikidata
View/Edit Human	View/Edit Mouse

Neuralized E3 ubiquitin protein ligase 3 is a protein that in humans is encoded by the NEURL3 gene.
