= Proline-rich protein 21 =

Protein-coding gene in the species Homo sapiens

PRR21

Identifiers
- Aliases: PRR21, Proline-rich protein 21, proline rich 21
- External IDs: GeneCards: PRR21
Orthologs
Databases	NCBI: entry; OMA: entry
Species	Human	Mouse
Entrez	643905	n/a
Ensembl	ENSG00000221961	n/a
UniProt	n a	n/a
RefSeq (mRNA)	NM_001080835	n/a
RefSeq (protein)	n/a	n/a
Location (UCSC)	n/a	n/a
PubMed search		n/a
- Wikidata
View/Edit Human

Human chromosome 2, including PRR21's position at 2q37.3.

Proline-rich protein 21 (PRR21) is a protein of the family of proline-rich proteins. It is encoded by the PRR21 gene, which is found on human chromosome 2, band 2q37.3. The gene exists in several species, both vertebrates and invertebrates, including humans. However, the protein have few conserved regions among species.

== Structure ==
PRR21 consists of 389 amino acids or 1170 base pairs, all found within one exon. Like other proline-rich proteins, it contains a repeated sequence of amino acids that contains several proline residues. The tandemly repeated sequence of PRR21 is 28 amino acids long and is repeated in full 11 times, with few variations. A logo displaying the variances of the repeat is shown below. The repeat constitute almost the entire protein, except for the very beginning and a short tail.

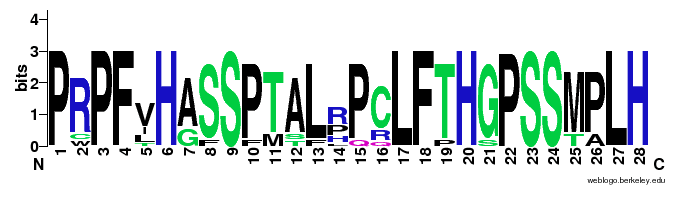
Repeated sequence of human PRR21.

=== Polymorphism ===
Many single-nucleotide polymorphisms (SNPs) are predicted for the gene, and several of these cause missense mutations. This allows for personal variances within the population, and contribution to the "uniqueness" of each individual.

=== Post-translational modifications ===
PRR21 has 28 possible phosphorylation sites. These follow the patterns of the repeated sequence. 22 out of 28 phosphorylation sites occur at serines at positions 9 and 24 in the repeat, both of which are highly conserved. Though, these serines can be changed by SNPs. Phosphorylation generally either activates or inactivates a protein. The protein has a no potential GPI-modification sites. PRR21 is not predicted to interact with any other proteins.

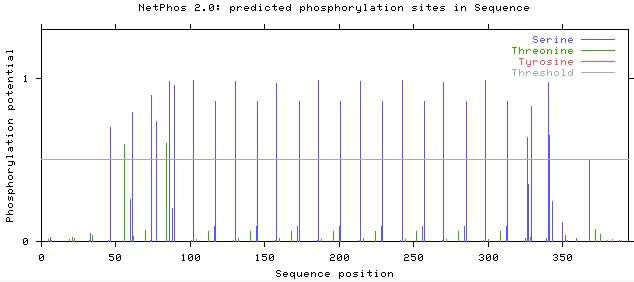
Illustration of predicted phosphorylation sites.

== Homology ==
PRR21 have no paralogs, and few orthologs. The orthologs are poorly conserved, as proline-rich proteins lack the need for specificity. Most important is that they have a loose structure and contain many prolines. The repeats often work as spacers only to make the protein big enough to interact with other proteins. Thus, orthologs often look dissimilar.

== Functions ==
There is 99.97% likelihood that PRR21 enters the mitochondria. PRR21 may be involved in stress responses that are related to phosphorylation of mitochondrial proteins. The gene is ubiquitously expressed, as nearly all eukaryotic cells contain mitochondria. PRR21 may be a salivary protein, as the tandemly repeated sequence constitute almost the entire protein, which is a common feature of salivary proline-rich proteins.

== Other proline-rich proteins ==
There are several kinds of proline-rich proteins, which can include either repetitive short sequences or tandemly repeated sequences. They have in common that the repeats, and the repeats only, contain unusual amounts of proline. They have a loose structure, which is caused by several features; the prolines have a shape that causes to chain to turn, and especially prevents alpha helices. Also, the proteins contain many positively charged residues that repel each other. This results in loose proteins that are suitable as binding proteins. These binding interactions can be hydrophobic interactions as proline-rich proteins tend to have exposed hydrophobic regions. The prolines themselves work as additional binding sites for hydrogen bonds by being strong hydrogen acceptors.
