= CYRI-A =

Protein-coding gene in the species Homo sapiens

CYRIA

Identifiers
- Aliases: CYRIA, family with sequence similarity 49 member A, FAM49A, CYFIP related Rac1 interactor A
- External IDs: MGI: 1261783; GeneCards: CYRIA

Gene location (Human)
Chr.	Chromosome 2 (human)
Band	2p24.2	Start	16,549,459 bp
Band	2p24.2	End	16,666,331 bp

Gene location (Mouse)
Chr.	Chromosome 12 (mouse)
Band	12 A1.1|12 5.63 cM	Start	12,312,140 bp
Band	12 A1.1|12 5.63 cM	End	12,430,966 bp
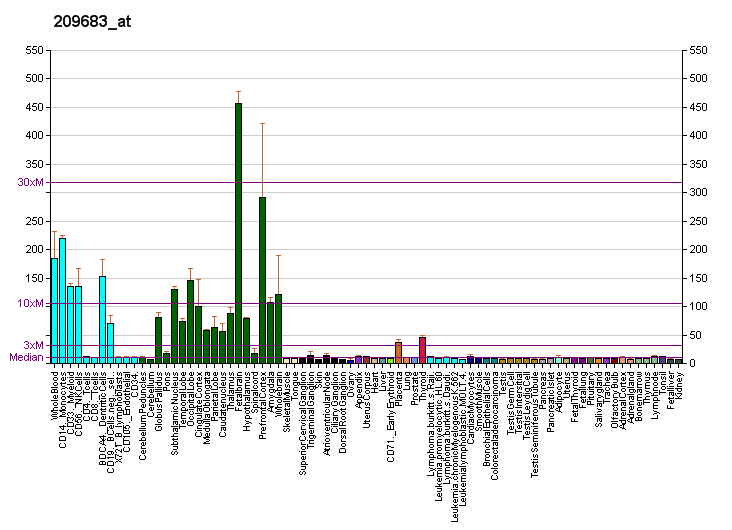

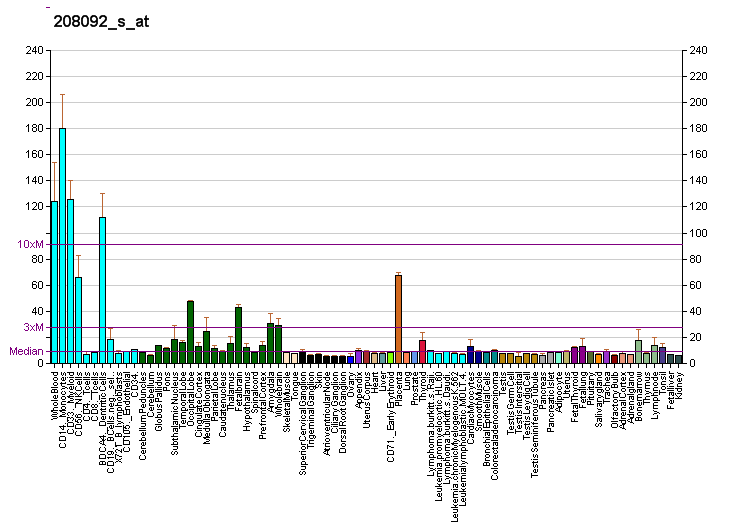
RNA expression pattern
Bgee	Human / Mouse (ortholog); Top expressed in: Brodmann area 23; monocyte; middle temporal gyrus; superior frontal gyrus; prefrontal cortex; entorhinal cortex; dorsolateral prefrontal cortex; orbitofrontal cortex; primary visual cortex; lateral nuclear group of thalamus / Top expressed in: olfactory tubercle; piriform cortex; cingulate gyrus; primary motor cortex; subiculum; anterior amygdaloid area; visual cortex; subdivision of hippocampus; Region I of hippocampus proper; nucleus accumbens; More reference expression data
BioGPS	More reference expression data
Orthologs
Databases	NCBI: entry; OMA: entry
Species	Human	Mouse
Entrez	81553	76820
Ensembl	ENSG00000197872	ENSMUSG00000020589
UniProt	Q9H0Q0	Q8BHZ0
RefSeq (mRNA)	NM_030797	NM_001146119; NM_029758; NM_001364432
RefSeq (protein)	NP_110424	NP_001139591; NP_084034; NP_001351361
Location (UCSC)	Chr 2: 16.55 – 16.67 Mb	Chr 12: 12.31 – 12.43 Mb
PubMed search
- Wikidata
View/Edit Human	View/Edit Mouse

CYFIP-related Rac1 interactor A (or CYRI-A) is a protein which in humans is encoded by the CYRIA gene (previously FAM49A).

== Gene ==
CYRIA is located on human chromosome 2, at 2p24.3. It has 1512 base pairs in the reference sequence mRNA transcript.

== Protein ==
The CYRI-A is a 323 amino acid protein. The protein contains two domains: Residues 15-319 comprise the "Domain of Unknown Function 1394" (DUF1394, Pfam PF07159). Residues 67->281 comprise the "Cytoplasmic Fragile X Interacting Superfamily" region.
