= Cell growth regulator with EF-hand domain 1 =

Protein found in humans

CGREF1

Identifiers
- Aliases: CGREF1, CGR11, cell growth regulator with EF-hand domain 1
- External IDs: OMIM: 606137; MGI: 1915817; GeneCards: CGREF1

Gene location (Human)
Chr.	Chromosome 2 (human)
Band	2p23.3	Start	27,098,889 bp
Band	2p23.3	End	27,119,128 bp

Gene location (Mouse)
Chr.	Chromosome 5 (mouse)
Band	5|5 B1	Start	31,090,487 bp
Band	5|5 B1	End	31,102,935 bp
RNA expression pattern
Bgee	Human / Mouse (ortholog); Top expressed in: right frontal lobe; nucleus accumbens; right hemisphere of cerebellum; prefrontal cortex; cingulate gyrus; anterior cingulate cortex; caudate nucleus; Brodmann area 9; putamen; amygdala / Top expressed in: intestinal villus; duodenum; right kidney; epithelium of small intestine; calvaria; proximal tubule; long bone; body of femur; human kidney; jejunum; More reference expression data
BioGPS	n/a
Gene ontology
Molecular function	calcium ion binding; metal ion binding
Cellular component	extracellular region
Biological process	cell cycle; cell adhesion; negative regulation of cell population proliferation
Sources:Amigo / QuickGO
Orthologs
Databases	NCBI: entry; OMA: entry
Species	Human	Mouse
Entrez	10669	68567
Ensembl	ENSG00000138028	ENSMUSG00000029161
UniProt	Q99674	Q8R1U2
RefSeq (mRNA)	NM_006569; NM_001166239; NM_001166240; NM_001166241; NM_001301324	NM_001160149; NM_026770
RefSeq (protein)	NP_001159711; NP_001159712; NP_001288253; NP_006560	NP_001153621; NP_081046
Location (UCSC)	Chr 2: 27.1 – 27.12 Mb	Chr 5: 31.09 – 31.1 Mb
PubMed search
- Wikidata
View/Edit Human	View/Edit Mouse

Cell growth regulator with EF-hand domain 1 is a protein that in humans is encoded by the CGREF1 gene.
