= EPB41L5 =

Protein-coding gene in the species Homo sapiens

Identifiers
- Aliases: EPB41L5, BE37, YMO1, YRT, erythrocyte membrane protein band 4.1 like 5, LULU1, LULU
- External IDs: OMIM: 611730; MGI: 103006; GeneCards: EPB41L5

Gene location (Human)
Chr.	Chromosome 2 (human)
Band	2q14.2	Start	120,013,077 bp
Band	2q14.2	End	120,179,119 bp

Gene location (Mouse)
Chr.	Chromosome 1 (mouse)
Band	1|1 E2.3	Start	119,472,767 bp
Band	1|1 E2.3	End	119,576,730 bp
RNA expression pattern
Bgee	Human / Mouse (ortholog); Top expressed in: oocyte; secondary oocyte; gonad; testicle; right lung; right lobe of liver; islet of Langerhans; left lobe of thyroid gland; ganglionic eminence; right lobe of thyroid gland / Top expressed in: secondary oocyte; zygote; right kidney; renal corpuscle; pineal gland; proximal tubule; tail of embryo; primary oocyte; human kidney; medullary collecting duct; More reference expression data
BioGPS	n/a
Gene ontology
Molecular function	protein domain specific binding; cytoskeletal protein binding; structural constituent of cytoskeleton
Cellular component	focal adhesion; adherens junction; plasma membrane; ruffle membrane; cell junction; cell leading edge; cytoplasm; cytoskeleton; nucleus; cytosol
Biological process	cellular response to transforming growth factor beta stimulus; somitogenesis; axial mesoderm development; endoderm development; negative regulation of cell-cell adhesion; embryonic foregut morphogenesis; epithelial cell morphogenesis; positive regulation of cell-matrix adhesion; substrate-dependent cell migration, cell attachment to substrate; neural plate morphogenesis; somite rostral/caudal axis specification; ectoderm development; positive regulation of epithelial cell migration; in utero embryonic development; negative regulation of protein binding; positive regulation of epithelial to mesenchymal transition; regulation of establishment of protein localization; axial mesoderm morphogenesis; epithelial to mesenchymal transition; posttranscriptional regulation of gene expression; unidimensional cell growth; positive regulation of focal adhesion assembly; mesoderm migration involved in gastrulation; positive regulation of protein binding; cell morphogenesis involved in differentiation; mesoderm development; apical constriction; left/right axis specification; actin cytoskeleton organization; paraxial mesoderm development; actomyosin structure organization
Sources:Amigo / QuickGO
Orthologs
Databases	NCBI: entry; OMA: entry
Species	Human	Mouse
Entrez	57669	226352
Ensembl	ENSG00000115109	ENSMUSG00000026383
UniProt	Q9HCM4	Q8BGS1
RefSeq (mRNA)	NM_001184937; NM_001184938; NM_001184939; NM_020909; NM_001330307 NM_001330310	NM_001113416; NM_145506
RefSeq (protein)	NP_001171866; NP_001171867; NP_001171868; NP_001317236; NP_001317239 NP_065960	NP_001106887; NP_663481
Location (UCSC)	Chr 2: 120.01 – 120.18 Mb	Chr 1: 119.47 – 119.58 Mb
PubMed search
- Wikidata
View/Edit Human	View/Edit Mouse

Erythrocyte membrane protein band 4.1 like 5 is a protein in humans that is encoded by the EPB41L5 gene.
