= SCARNA5 =

Non-coding RNA in the species Homo sapiens

Identifiers
- Aliases: SCARNA5, U87, small Cajal body-specific RNA 5
- External IDs: OMIM: 615640; GeneCards: SCARNA5

Gene location (Human)
Chr.	Chromosome 2 (human)
Band	2q37.1	Start	233,275,727 bp
Band	2q37.1	End	233,276,002 bp
RNA expression pattern
Bgee	Human / Mouse (ortholog); Top expressed in: epithelium of colon; corpus callosum; bone marrow cell; tonsil; skeletal muscle tissue; sural nerve; testicle; muscle of thigh; Achilles tendon; primary visual cortex / n/a; More reference expression data
BioGPS	n/a
Orthologs
Databases	NCBI: entry; OMA: entry
Species	Human	Mouse
Entrez	677775	n/a
Ensembl	ENSG00000252010; ENSG00000280652	n/a
UniProt	n a	n/a
RefSeq (mRNA)	n/a	n/a
RefSeq (protein)	n/a	n/a
Location (UCSC)	Chr 2: 233.28 – 233.28 Mb	n/a
PubMed search		n/a
- Wikidata
View/Edit Human

Small Cajal body-specific RNA 5 is a protein that in humans is encoded by the SCARNA5 gene.
