= SP140 =

Protein-coding gene in the species Homo sapiens

Identifiers
- Aliases: SP140, LYSP100, LYSP100-A, LYSP100-B, SP140 nuclear body protein
- External IDs: OMIM: 608602; MGI: 3702467; GeneCards: SP140
Available structures
PDB	Human UniProt search: PDBe RCSB
PDB	List of PDB id codes 2MD7, 2MD8

Gene location (Human)
Chr.	Chromosome 2 (human)
Band	2q37.1	Start	230,203,110 bp
Band	2q37.1	End	230,313,215 bp

Gene location (Mouse)
Chr.	Chromosome 1 (mouse)
Band	1|1 C5	Start	85,600,378 bp
Band	1|1 C5	End	85,645,037 bp
RNA expression pattern
Bgee	Human / Mouse (ortholog); Top expressed in: lymph node; granulocyte; spleen; appendix; blood; monocyte; tonsil; bone marrow cell; testicle; epithelium of nasopharynx / Top expressed in: blastocyst; granulocyte; spleen; bone marrow; thymus; morula; urinary bladder; white adipose tissue; zone of skin; lung; More reference expression data
BioGPS	n/a
Gene ontology
Molecular function	DNA-binding transcription factor activity; DNA binding; protein binding; metal ion binding
Cellular component	cytoplasm; PML body; nuclear envelope; mitochondrion; nucleus; nucleoplasm; fibrillar center; nuclear body
Biological process	defense response; regulation of transcription, DNA-templated
Sources:Amigo / QuickGO
Orthologs
Databases	NCBI: entry; OMA: entry
Species	Human	Mouse
Entrez	11262	434484
Ensembl	ENSG00000079263	ENSMUSG00000070031
UniProt	Q13342	n/a
RefSeq (mRNA)	NM_001005176; NM_001278451; NM_001278452; NM_001278453; NM_007237	NM_001013817
RefSeq (protein)	NP_001005176; NP_001265380; NP_001265381; NP_001265382; NP_009168	n/a
Location (UCSC)	Chr 2: 230.2 – 230.31 Mb	Chr 1: 85.6 – 85.65 Mb
PubMed search
- Wikidata
View/Edit Human	View/Edit Mouse

SP140 nuclear body protein is a protein that in humans is encoded by the SP140 gene.
