= TMBIM1 =

Protein-coding gene in the species Homo sapiens

Identifiers
- Aliases: TMBIM1, LFG3, MST100, MSTP100, RECS1, PP1201, transmembrane BAX inhibitor motif containing 1
- External IDs: OMIM: 610364; MGI: 1916910; HomoloGene: 36404; GeneCards: TMBIM1; OMA:TMBIM1 - orthologs

Gene location (Human)
Chr.	Chromosome 2 (human)
Band	2q35	Start	218,274,197 bp
Band	2q35	End	218,292,586 bp

Gene location (Mouse)
Chr.	Chromosome 1 (mouse)
Band	1|1 C3	Start	74,327,406 bp
Band	1|1 C3	End	74,344,781 bp
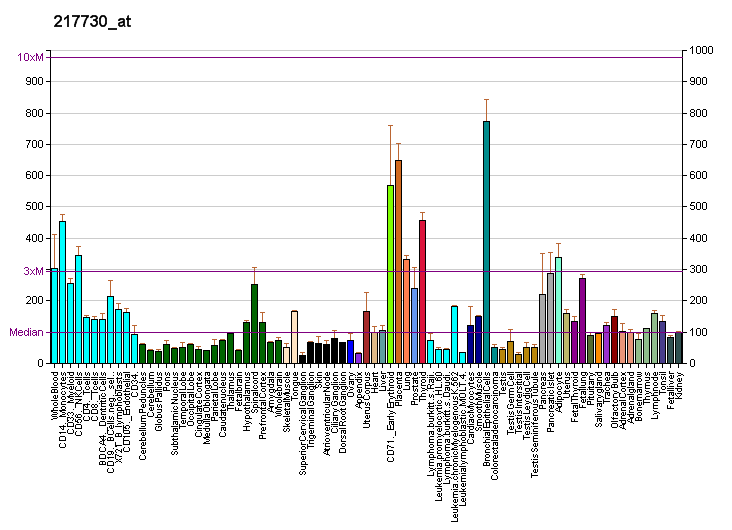
RNA expression pattern
Bgee	Human / Mouse (ortholog); Top expressed in: Descending thoracic aorta; ascending aorta; body of pancreas; body of stomach; gastric mucosa; right lung; gallbladder; skin of leg; skin of abdomen; popliteal artery / Top expressed in: epithelium of stomach; pyloric antrum; vestibular membrane of cochlear duct; left colon; ankle; mucous cell of stomach; ascending aorta; aortic valve; carotid body; transitional epithelium of urinary bladder; More reference expression data
BioGPS	More reference expression data
Gene ontology
Molecular function	death receptor binding
Cellular component	integral component of membrane; lysosomal membrane; endosome; Golgi apparatus; lysosome; endosome membrane; extracellular exosome; membrane; plasma membrane; specific granule membrane; intracellular membrane-bounded organelle
Biological process	negative regulation of Fas signaling pathway; positive regulation of blood vessel remodeling; negative regulation of extrinsic apoptotic signaling pathway via death domain receptors; negative regulation of catalytic activity; neutrophil degranulation; negative regulation of protein localization to plasma membrane
Sources:Amigo / QuickGO
Orthologs
Species	Human	Mouse
Entrez	64114	69660
Ensembl	ENSG00000135926	ENSMUSG00000006301
UniProt	Q969X1	Q8BJZ3
RefSeq (mRNA)	NM_022152; NM_001321427; NM_001321428; NM_001321429; NM_001321430 NM_001321432; NM_001321433; NM_001321435; NM_001321436; NM_001321438	NM_027154
RefSeq (protein)	NP_001308356; NP_001308357; NP_001308358; NP_001308359; NP_001308361 NP_001308362; NP_001308364; NP_001308365; NP_001308367; NP_071435	NP_081430
Location (UCSC)	Chr 2: 218.27 – 218.29 Mb	Chr 1: 74.33 – 74.34 Mb
PubMed search
- Wikidata
View/Edit Human	View/Edit Mouse

Transmembrane BAX inhibitor motif-containing protein 1 is a protein that in humans is encoded by the TMBIM1 gene.
