= ITM2C =

Protein-coding gene in the species Homo sapiens

Identifiers
- Aliases: ITM2C, BRI3, BRICD2C, E25, E25C, ITM3, integral membrane protein 2C
- External IDs: OMIM: 609554; MGI: 1927594; GeneCards: ITM2C

Gene location (Human)
Chr.	Chromosome 2 (human)
Band	2q37.1	Start	230,864,639 bp
Band	2q37.1	End	230,879,248 bp

Gene location (Mouse)
Chr.	Chromosome 1 (mouse)
Band	1|1 C5	Start	85,822,002 bp
Band	1|1 C5	End	85,836,396 bp
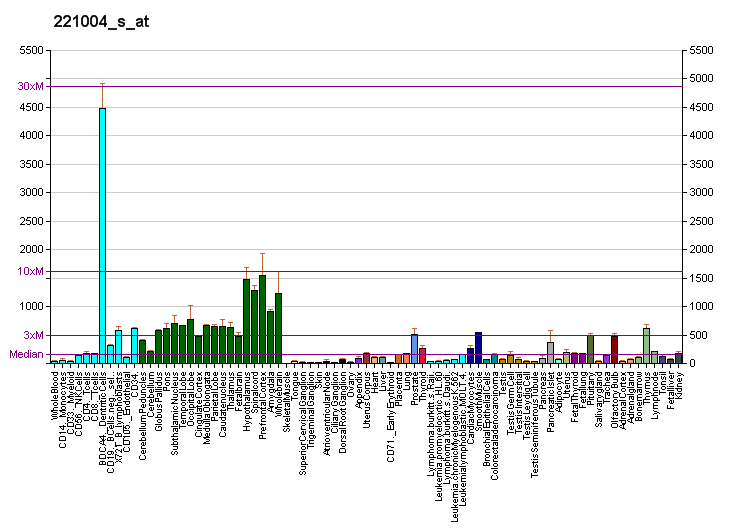
RNA expression pattern
Bgee	Human / Mouse (ortholog); Top expressed in: mucosa of transverse colon; nucleus accumbens; anterior cingulate cortex; caudate nucleus; amygdala; external globus pallidus; rectum; prefrontal cortex; hypothalamus; putamen / Top expressed in: olfactory tubercle; nucleus accumbens; nucleus of stria terminalis; supraoptic nucleus; entorhinal cortex; arcuate nucleus; CA3 field; lateral septal nucleus; median eminence; paraventricular nucleus of hypothalamus; More reference expression data
BioGPS	More reference expression data
Gene ontology
Molecular function	amyloid-beta binding; protein binding; ATP binding
Cellular component	perinuclear region of cytoplasm; integral component of membrane; lysosomal membrane; extracellular exosome; membrane; lysosome; plasma membrane; Golgi apparatus
Biological process	positive regulation of extrinsic apoptotic signaling pathway; negative regulation of neuron projection development; neuron differentiation; negative regulation of amyloid precursor protein biosynthetic process
Sources:Amigo / QuickGO
Orthologs
Databases	NCBI: entry; OMA: entry
Species	Human	Mouse
Entrez	81618	64294
Ensembl	ENSG00000135916	ENSMUSG00000026223
UniProt	Q9NQX7	Q91VK4
RefSeq (mRNA)	NM_030926; NM_001012514; NM_001012516; NM_001287240; NM_001287241	NM_022417
RefSeq (protein)	NP_001012532; NP_001012534; NP_001274169; NP_001274170; NP_112188	NP_071862
Location (UCSC)	Chr 2: 230.86 – 230.88 Mb	Chr 1: 85.82 – 85.84 Mb
PubMed search
- Wikidata
View/Edit Human	View/Edit Mouse

Integral membrane protein 2C is a protein that in humans is encoded by the ITM2C gene.
