= ATRAID =

Protein-coding gene in humans

Identifiers
- Aliases: ATRAID, APR--3, APR-3, APR3, C2orf28, PRO240, p18, HSPC013, all-trans retinoic acid induced differentiation factor
- External IDs: MGI: 1918918; GeneCards: ATRAID

Gene location (Human)
| Chr. | Chromosome 2 (human) |
| Band | 2p23.3 | Start | 27,212,041 bp |
| Band | 2p23.3 | End | 27,217,178 bp |

Gene location (Mouse)
| Chr. | Chromosome 5 (mouse) |
| Band | 5|5 B1 | Start | 31,205,656 bp |
| Band | 5|5 B1 | End | 31,211,967 bp |
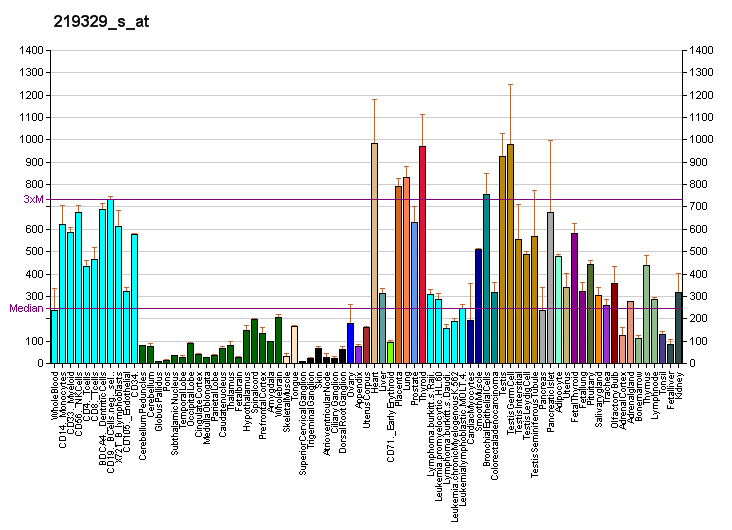
RNA expression pattern
| Bgee | Human / Mouse (ortholog); Top expressed in: beta cell; corpus epididymis; right uterine tube; apex of heart; left ovary; right ovary; right auricle of heart; right testis; left lobe of thyroid gland; right lobe of thyroid gland / Top expressed in: right kidney; optic nerve; arcuate nucleus; umbilical cord; median eminence; islet of Langerhans; vestibular sensory epithelium; human kidney; yolk sac; white adipose tissue; More reference expression data |
| BioGPS | More reference expression data |
Gene ontology
| Molecular function | protein binding; molecular function |
| Cellular component | perinuclear region of cytoplasm; integral component of membrane; lysosomal membrane; plasma membrane; nuclear envelope; membrane; nucleus |
| Biological process | regulation of gene expression; negative regulation of osteoblast proliferation; cell differentiation; positive regulation of osteoblast differentiation; positive regulation of bone mineralization |
Sources:Amigo / QuickGO
Orthologs
| Databases | NCBI: entry; OMA: entry |
| Species | Human | Mouse |
| Entrez | 51374 | 381629 |
| Ensembl | ENSG00000138085 | ENSMUSG00000013622 |
| UniProt | Q6UW56 | Q6PGD0 |
| RefSeq (mRNA) | NM_080592; NM_001170795; NM_016085 | NM_027855; NM_212470 |
| RefSeq (protein) | NP_001164266; NP_057169 | NP_082131; NP_997635 |
| Location (UCSC) | Chr 2: 27.21 – 27.22 Mb | Chr 5: 31.21 – 31.21 Mb |
| PubMed search |
- Wikidata
| View/Edit Human | View/Edit Mouse |

Apoptosis-related protein 3 is a protein that in humans is encoded by the ATRAID gene.

This gene is thought to be involved in apoptosis, and may also be involved in hematopoietic development and differentiation. Two alternatively spliced transcript variants encoding different isoforms have been found for this gene.
