= LANCL1 =

Protein-coding gene in the species Homo sapiens

Available structures
PDB	Ortholog search: PDBe RCSB
PDB	List of PDB id codes 3E6U, 3E73

Identifiers
- Aliases: LANCL1, GPR69A, p40, LanC like 1
- External IDs: OMIM: 604155; MGI: 1336997; HomoloGene: 4417; GeneCards: LANCL1; OMA:LANCL1 - orthologs

Gene location (Human)
Chr.	Chromosome 2 (human)
Band	2q34	Start	210,431,249 bp
Band	2q34	End	210,477,652 bp

Gene location (Mouse)
Chr.	Chromosome 1 (mouse)
Band	1|1 C3	Start	67,039,676 bp
Band	1|1 C3	End	67,078,031 bp
RNA expression pattern
Bgee	Human / Mouse (ortholog); Top expressed in: endothelial cell; corpus callosum; inferior ganglion of vagus nerve; subthalamic nucleus; inferior olivary nucleus; Brodmann area 46; pars reticulata; postcentral gyrus; external globus pallidus; lateral nuclear group of thalamus / Top expressed in: seminiferous tubule; spermatid; spermatocyte; corneal stroma; primary oocyte; facial motor nucleus; anterior horn of spinal cord; barrel cortex; cingulate gyrus; olfactory tubercle; More reference expression data
BioGPS	n/a
Gene ontology
Molecular function	SH3 domain binding; low-density lipoprotein particle receptor binding; zinc ion binding; protein binding; G protein-coupled receptor activity; metal ion binding; glutathione binding; catalytic activity; glutathione transferase activity; transferase activity
Cellular component	cytoplasm; integral component of plasma membrane; membrane; plasma membrane
Biological process	G protein-coupled receptor signaling pathway; regulation of neuron apoptotic process; regulation of oxidative stress-induced neuron death
Sources:Amigo / QuickGO
Orthologs
Species	Human	Mouse
Entrez	10314	14768
Ensembl	ENSG00000115365	ENSMUSG00000026000
UniProt	O43813	O89112
RefSeq (mRNA)	NM_001136574; NM_001136575; NM_006055	NM_001190984; NM_001190985; NM_021295
RefSeq (protein)	NP_001130046; NP_001130047; NP_006046	NP_001177913; NP_001177914; NP_067270
Location (UCSC)	Chr 2: 210.43 – 210.48 Mb	Chr 1: 67.04 – 67.08 Mb
PubMed search
- Wikidata
View/Edit Human	View/Edit Mouse

LanC like 1 is a protein that in humans is encoded by the LANCL1 gene.

== Function ==
This gene encodes a loosely associated peripheral membrane protein related to the LanC family of bacterial membrane-associated proteins involved in the biosynthesis of antimicrobial peptides. This protein may play a role as a peptide-modifying enzyme component in eukaryotic cells. Previously considered a member of the G-protein-coupled receptor superfamily, this protein is now in the LanC family. Multiple alternatively spliced variants, encoding the same protein, have been identified.
