= Phosphotyrosine interaction domain containing 1 =

Protein-coding gene in the species Homo sapiens

PID1

Identifiers
- Aliases: PID1, NYGGF4, P-CLI1, PCLI1, HMFN2073, phosphotyrosine interaction domain containing 1
- External IDs: OMIM: 612930; MGI: 2138391; HomoloGene: 9924; GeneCards: PID1; OMA:PID1 - orthologs

Gene location (Human)
Chr.	Chromosome 2 (human)
Band	2q36.3	Start	228,850,526 bp
Band	2q36.3	End	229,271,287 bp

Gene location (Mouse)
Chr.	Chromosome 1 (mouse)
Band	1|1 C5	Start	84,014,017 bp
Band	1|1 C5	End	84,341,901 bp
RNA expression pattern
Bgee	Human / Mouse (ortholog); Top expressed in: Descending thoracic aorta; ascending aorta; gastric mucosa; decidua; Achilles tendon; tibia; liver; right lobe of liver; right adrenal cortex; right coronary artery / Top expressed in: stroma of bone marrow; otolith organ; utricle; piriform cortex; molar; liver; left lobe of liver; prostate; medial ganglionic eminence; calvaria; More reference expression data
BioGPS	n/a
Gene ontology
Molecular function	protein binding
Cellular component	cytoplasm
Biological process	negative regulation of protein phosphorylation; cellular response to interleukin-6; cellular response to tumor necrosis factor; regulation of reactive oxygen species metabolic process; cellular response to leptin stimulus; cellular response to cytokine stimulus; positive regulation of ATP biosynthetic process; regulation of mitochondrial membrane potential; negative regulation of insulin receptor signaling pathway; negative regulation of glucose import; positive regulation of gene expression; cellular response to fatty acid; positive regulation of reactive oxygen species metabolic process; negative regulation of ATP biosynthetic process; energy reserve metabolic process; mitochondrion morphogenesis; fat cell differentiation; positive regulation of fat cell proliferation; regulation of mitochondrial fusion; positive regulation of transcription by RNA polymerase II; negative regulation of protein localization to plasma membrane; regulation of cell population proliferation
Sources:Amigo / QuickGO
Orthologs
Species	Human	Mouse
Entrez	55022	98496
Ensembl	ENSG00000153823	ENSMUSG00000045658
UniProt	Q7Z2X4	Q3UBG2
RefSeq (mRNA)	NM_001100818; NM_017933; NM_001330156; NM_001330157; NM_001330158	NM_001003948
RefSeq (protein)	NP_001094288; NP_001317085; NP_001317086; NP_001317087; NP_060403	NP_001003948
Location (UCSC)	Chr 2: 228.85 – 229.27 Mb	Chr 1: 84.01 – 84.34 Mb
PubMed search
- Wikidata
View/Edit Human	View/Edit Mouse

Phosphotyrosine interaction domain containing 1 is a protein that in humans is encoded by the PID1 gene.
