= ID2-AS1 =

Non-coding RNA in humans

Identifiers
- Aliases: ID2-AS1, ID2 antisense RNA 1 (head to head), ID2 antisense RNA 1
- External IDs: GeneCards: ID2-AS1
Orthologs
Databases	NCBI: entry; OMA: entry
Species	Human	Mouse
Entrez	100506299	n/a
Ensembl	ENSG00000235092	n/a
UniProt	n a	n/a
RefSeq (mRNA)	n/a	n/a
RefSeq (protein)	n/a	n/a
Location (UCSC)	n/a	n/a
PubMed search		n/a
- Wikidata
View/Edit Human

ID2 antisense RNA 1 (head to head) is a non-coding RNA that in humans is encoded by the ID2-AS1 gene.
