= PARK3 =

Genetic element in the species Homo sapiens

Identifiers
- Aliases: PARK3, PARK3 (gene), Parkinson disease 3 (autosomal dominant, Lewy body)
- External IDs: GeneCards: PARK3; OMA:PARK3 - orthologs
Orthologs
Species	Human	Mouse
Entrez	5072	n/a
Ensembl	n/a	n/a
UniProt	n a	n/a
RefSeq (mRNA)	n/a	n/a
RefSeq (protein)	n/a	n/a
Location (UCSC)	n/a	n/a
PubMed search		n/a
- Wikidata
View/Edit Human

Parkinson disease 3 (autosomal dominant, Lewy body) is a protein that in humans is encoded by the PARK3 gene.
