= LSL (gene) =

Genetic element in the species Homo sapiens

LEPQTL1

Identifiers
- Aliases: LSLLeptinserum levels of
- External IDs: GeneCards: ; OMA:- orthologs
Orthologs
Species	Human	Mouse
Entrez	7839	n/a
Ensembl	n/a	n/a
UniProt	n a	n/a
RefSeq (mRNA)	n/a	n/a
RefSeq (protein)	n/a	n/a
Location (UCSC)	n/a	n/a
PubMed search		n/a
- Wikidata
View/Edit Human

Leptin, serum levels of, also known as LSL, is a human gene.
