= Ferritin heavy chain 1 pseudogene 3 =

Protein found in humans

FTH1P3

Identifiers
- Aliases: FTH1P3, FTHL3, FTHL3P, ferritin, heavy polypeptide 1 pseudogene 3, ferritin heavy chain 1 pseudogene 3
- External IDs: GeneCards: FTH1P3; OMA:FTH1P3 - orthologs
Orthologs
Species	Human	Mouse
Entrez	2498	n/a
Ensembl	ENSG00000213453	n/a
UniProt	n a	n/a
RefSeq (mRNA)	n/a	n/a
RefSeq (protein)	n/a	n/a
Location (UCSC)	n/a	n/a
PubMed search		n/a
- Wikidata
View/Edit Human

Ferritin heavy chain 1 pseudogene 3 is a protein that, in humans, is encoded by the FTH1P3 gene.
