= TMEM221 =

Protein

Identifiers
- Aliases: TMEM221, transmembrane protein 221
- External IDs: MGI: 3525074; GeneCards: TMEM221

Gene location (Human)
Chr.	Chromosome 19 (human)
Band	19p13.11	Start	17,435,509 bp
Band	19p13.11	End	17,448,668 bp

Gene location (Mouse)
Chr.	Chromosome 8 (mouse)
Band	8|8 B3.3	Start	72,006,882 bp
Band	8|8 B3.3	End	72,011,515 bp
RNA expression pattern
Bgee	Human / Mouse (ortholog); Top expressed in: ventricular zone; testicle; left ovary; right adrenal cortex; right ovary; prefrontal cortex; left adrenal gland; left adrenal cortex; right frontal lobe; anterior cingulate cortex / Top expressed in: blastocyst; embryo; right kidney; adrenal gland; embryo; ovary; lung; thymus; pancreas; human kidney; More reference expression data
BioGPS	n/a
Orthologs
Databases	NCBI: entry; OMA: entry
Species	Human	Mouse
Entrez	100130519	434325
Ensembl	ENSG00000188051	ENSMUSG00000043664
UniProt	A6NGB7	Q8K071
RefSeq (mRNA)	NM_001190844	NM_001100462
RefSeq (protein)	NP_001177773	NP_001093932
Location (UCSC)	Chr 19: 17.44 – 17.45 Mb	Chr 8: 72.01 – 72.01 Mb
PubMed search
- Wikidata
View/Edit Human	View/Edit Mouse

Transmembrane protein 221 (TMEM221) is a protein that in humans is encoded by the TMEM221 gene. The function of TMEM221 is currently not well understood.

== Gene ==
=== General properties ===
TMEM221 is also known as Putative Transmembrane Protein ENSP00000342162. The TMEM221 gene is 13,159 base pairs long, contains three exons, and is located on the short arm of chromosome 19 at 19p13.11 in humans. It spans from 17,435,509 to 17,448,668 on the minus strand. It is flanked by MVB12A upstream, and by AC010319.5 and NXNL1 downstream.

=== Promoter ===
The predicted promoter region (GXP_1485843) is 2016 base pairs long and extends into the beginning of the second exon of TMEM221. The most abundant and highly predicted transcription factors to bind to the promoter are outlined in the table below.

Transcription factor	Detailed matrix information	Anchor base	Matrix similarity	Sequence
BRNF	Brn POU domain factors	11	0.905	caaccatTAATctacttct
KLFS	Krueppel like transcription factor	45	0.939	gggggaatggGGAGtggct
LHXF	Lim homeodomain factors	156	0.931	taaaatgaTTAAttttatgttat
HOXF	Paralog hox genes 1-8 from the four hox clusters A, B, C, D	210	0.899	gcgaaTAATttgggggacc
CTCF	CTCF and BORIS gene family, transcriptional regulators with 11 highly conserved zinc finger domains	256	0.813	cgttgcttcctctaggaGGCTagggag
PBXC	Pre B-cell leukemia homeobox 3	403	1.000	agcctgagTGACagagc
NKRF	Nuclear factor-kappaB repressing factor	590	0.854	aacTCCTgggc
LEFF	T-cell specific HMG-box transcription factor 7	701	0.879	actccatCAAAaaaaaa
CEBP	Ccaat/Enhancer Binding Protein	744	0.941	gcagtggtGCAAtct
HNFP	Histone nuclear factor P	763	0.843	ggCGGAggttgcagtgagc
CART	Cart-1 (cartilage homeoprotein 1)	854	0.862	cgggcTAATtttttttttttt
TF2B	RNA polymerase II transcription factor II B	987	1.000	ccgCGCC
CAAT	CCAAT binding factor	1229	0.926	ctggCCAAtatggtg
VTBP	Vertebrate TATA binding protein factor	1342	0.852	tgtttTAAAccacaata
PLAG	Pleomorphic adenoma gene	1419	0.844	ctgtGGGGttcccgcgatccagt
NDPK	Nucleoside diphosphate kinase	1447	0.910	gcAGGGcggggaggccc
E2FF	E2F-myc activator/cell cycle regulator	1471	0.989	gcgggGCGGggcctggc
ZF5F	ZF5 POZ domain zinc finger	1504	0.957	gaggggGCGCccgcg
ZF5F		1505	0.957	ccgcggGCGCcccct
ZTRE	Zinc transcriptional regulatory element	1525	0.988	ccgGGAGggaggagaaa

=== Expression ===
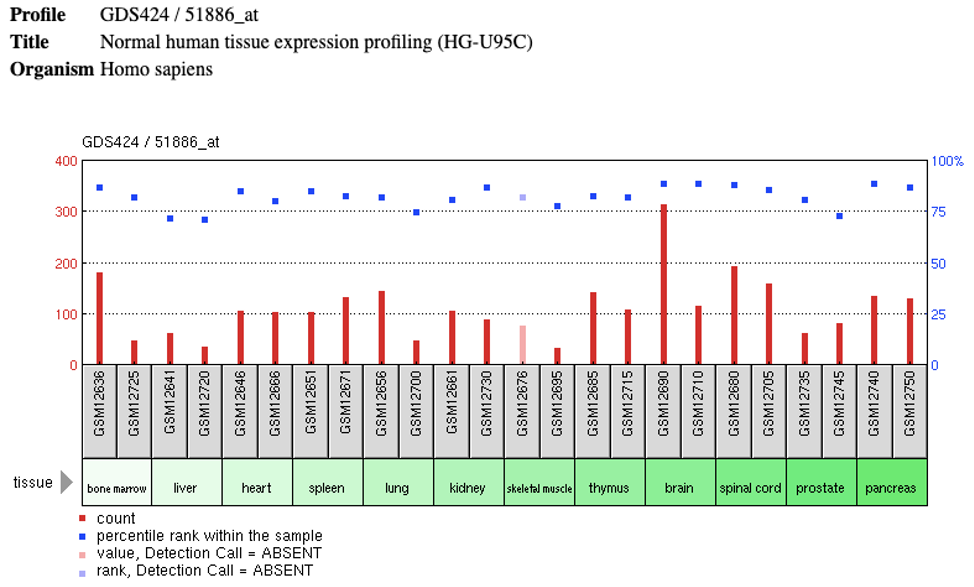
Expression profile of TMEM221.

TMEM221 is highly expressed relative to other human genes in nearly every tissue type, suggesting it could potentially be a housekeeping gene. It is shown consistently to be most highly expressed in the brain, adrenal gland, and ovaries. Conditional expression demonstrates decreased expression of TMEM221 in ovarian cancer, lymphomas, and bone cancer.

== mRNA ==
The longest transcript of TMEM221 is 2,301 base pairs longs. It has one X1 isoform that is 1,547 base pairs long and contains one exon.

=== Transcript level regulation ===
The mRNA structure of TMEM221 is predicted to have stem loop formation important for protein recognition and stability. There is one splice enhancer site with two DNAse hypersensitivity sites and bindings sites for transcription factors including CTCF, FOS, NFYB, and NFYA.

== Protein ==
=== General properties ===
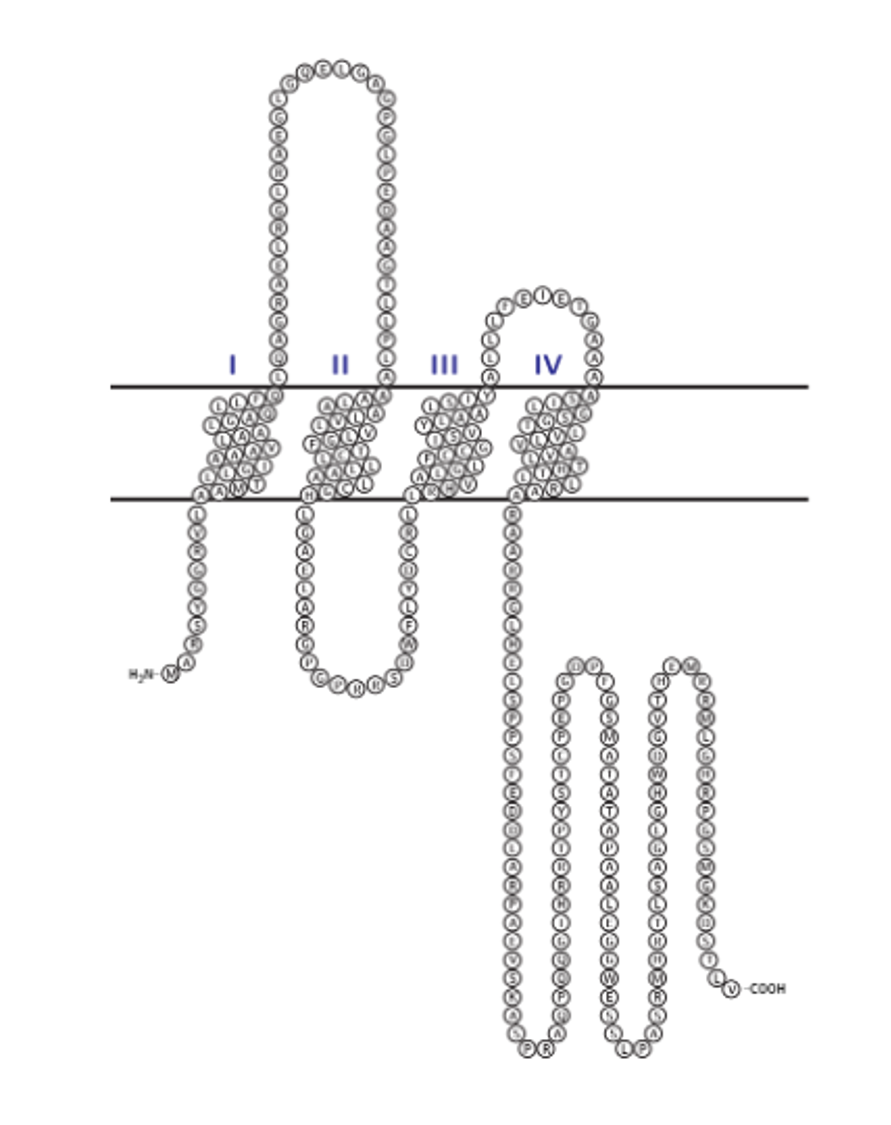
TMEM221 transmembrane domains.

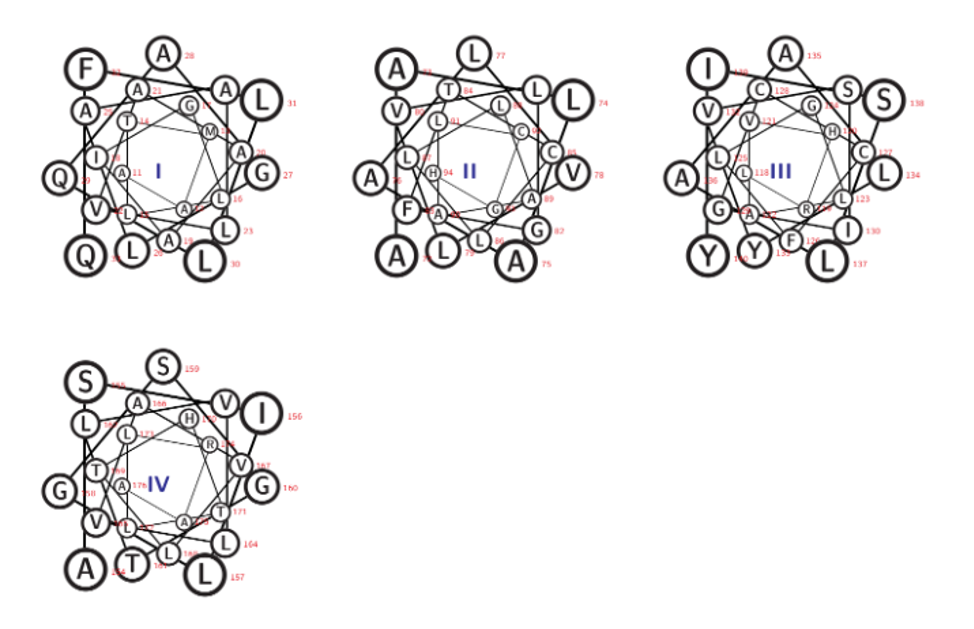
TMEM221 transmembrane helices.

The TMEM221 protein is 291 amino acids long and contains four transmembrane domains. The protein of the X1 variant is 232 amino acids long and contains one transmembrane domain. TMEM221 has a predicted molecular weight of 30 kDa and is slightly basic with a predicted isoelectric point of 8.6.

=== Composition ===
TMEM221 has a significantly higher composition of leucine, alanine, and glycine as compared to other human proteins. It also has a significantly lower composition of asparagine and isoleucine. It has no high scoring charge clusters or charged segments.

=== Domains and Motifs ===
TMEM221 has two conserved motifs, Jiraiya and DUF5408. The Jiraiya motif was found in all orthologs and composes the three latter transmembrane regions. Jiraiya is reported to be a factor in attenuation of bone morphogenetic protein (BMP) signaling. The DUF5408 motif is not yet characterized.

=== Structure ===
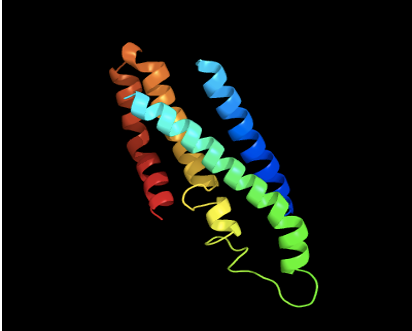
Tertiary structure of TMEM221.

TMEM221 protein is predicted to be composed of approximately 58% random coil, 20% alpha helix, and 22% extended strand. The tertiary structure is predicted to have three disulfide bridges between conserved cysteines that are in the non-cytoplasmic regions as well as one crossing between the non-cytoplasmic region and the second transmembrane region.

=== Subcellular location ===
TMEM221 is predicted to be mostly localized to the endoplasmic reticulum, but also distributed throughout the mitochondria, vacuolar, plasma membrane, and extracellular space.

=== Signal peptide ===
TMEM221 has a predicted signal peptide cleavage site between bases 24 and 25.

=== Post-translational modifications ===
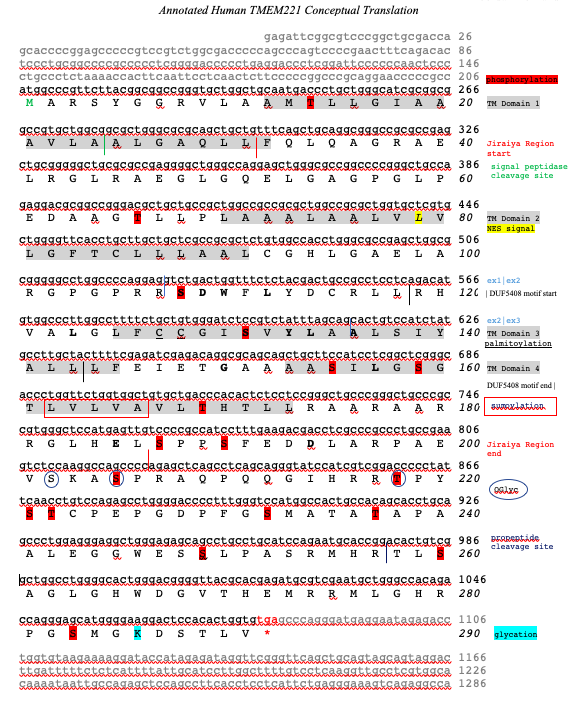
TMEM221 conceptual translation.

The only lipid modification TMEM221 has is one palmitoylation site, indicating that its trafficking may not be highly regulated. There is one predicted glycation site. There is one NES signal which is expected as the protein is expected to be located in the cytoplasm, among other locations. O-glycosylation is predicted at three sites that are likely important for protein stability and function. There are many possible phosphorylation sites, some with multiple possible kinases, that are likely important for protein activation. There is one SUMOylation site that would aid in nuclear-cytosolic transport.

== Homology/evolution ==
=== Paralogs ===
TMEM221 has one predicted paralog, hCG2038292. This protein is mostly highly conserved through the Jiraiya sequence. This diverged approximately 400 million years ago.

=== Orthologs ===
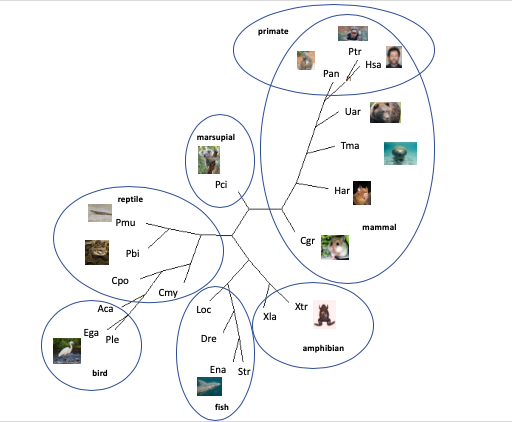
Phylogenetic tree of TMEM221.

TMEM221 is conserved throughout vertebrates but not in invertebrates, plants, or any other organisms. The most distant identified ortholog is the live shark sucker.

Genus and species	Common name	Taxonomic group	DoD (mya)	Accession number	Sequence length (AA)	Percent identity
Homo sapiens	Human	Mammal, Primate	0	NP_001177773.1	291	100%
Pan troglodytes	Chimpanzee	Mammal, Primate	7	XP_016790933.2	291	98%
Papio anubis	Olive Baboon	Mammal, Primate	29	XP_003919243.1	290	96%
Cricetulus griseus	Chinese Hamster	Mammal, Rodentia	89	XP_027250594.1	291	72%
Ursus arctos	Grizzly Bear	Mammal, Carnivora	96	XP_026356267.1	291	87%
Hipposideros armiger	Great Roundleaf Bat	Mammal, Chiroptera	96	XP_019497376.1	291	85%
Trichechus manatus latirostris	West Indian Manatee	Mammal, Sirenia	105	XP_004384461.1	291	86%
Phascolarctos cinereus	Koala	Marsupial	159	XP_020864777.1	288	48%
Crocodylus porosus	Saltwater Crocodile	Reptile	312	XP_019393978.1	233	38%
Egretta garzetta	Little Egret	Bird	312	XP_009641067.1	209	32%
Podarcis muralis	Common Wall Lizard	Reptile	318	XP_028569471.1	305	43%
Chelonia mydas	Green Sea Turtle	Reptile	318	XP_027689962.1	280	33%
Phaethon lepturus	White-tailed Tropicbird	Bird	318	XP_010280379.1	200	30%
Python bivittatus	Burmese Python	Reptile	318	XP_025027154.1	232	30%
Antrostomus carolinensis	Chuck-will's-widow	Bird	318	XP_010164009.2	207	23%
Xenopus tropicalis	Western Clawed Frog	Amphibian	352	XP_004911082.1	306	37%
Xenopus laevis	African Clawed Frog	Amphibian	352	NP_001182024.1	306	37%
Danio rerio	Zebrafish	Fish	433	XP_003201087.1	287	37%
Salmo trutto	Brown Trout	Fish	433	XP_029562717.1	304	34%
Lepisosteus osculatus	Spotted Gard	Fish	433	XP_015221220.1	170	17%
Echeneis naucrates	Live Shark Sucker	Fish	433	XP_029356055.1	312	34%

=== Rate of Evolution ===
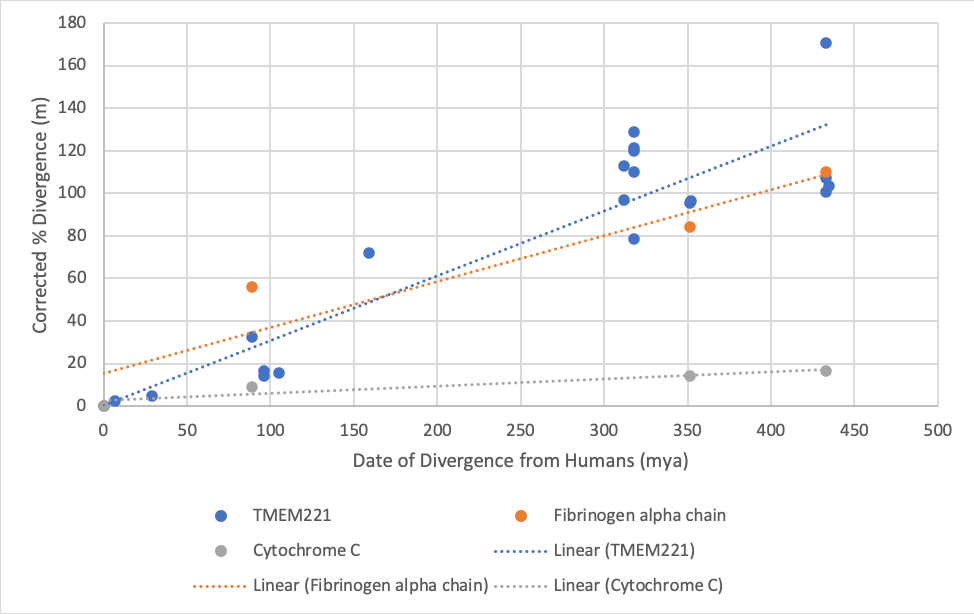
Rate of divergence of TMEM221 as compared to fibrinogen and cytochrome C.

TMEM221 is a rapidly evolving gene with a rate of divergence faster than cytochrome C, a slowly evolving gene, and fibrinogen, a rapidly evolving gene.

== Function/biochemistry ==
=== Interacting proteins ===
TMEM221 has been shown to interact with GPR137C, TMEM211, OVOL3, TMEM132E, TMEM171, TMEM150C, GPR162, TMC5, and BAI2. These are all predicted to play an important role in taste cell function.

== Clinical significance ==
=== Disease association ===
A human disease known to be associated with TMEM221 is amoebiasis, a digestive infection caused by the amoeba Entamoeba histolytica. The gene is also shown to be less expressed in a multitude of cancers including ovarian cancer, lymphoma, and bone cancer among others.

=== Mutations ===
There were many potential sites for SNPs in the coding sequence of TMEM221. Notably, W110 has five potential SNPs in its second and third codon positions. There are many other SNPs identified in other conserved amino acids, but these resulted in silent mutations.

Position in protein	Mutation type	Codon position	Change in nucleic acid	Change in amino acid	Rs number
13	Frame Shift/Nonsense	1	A → -	M → stop	rs758599058
33	Nonsense	1	C → T	Q → stop	rs1304244986
44	Frame Shift	3	G → -	L → C	rs1425689981
103	Frame Shift	3	G → -	P → L	rs1402509177
110	Nonsense Frameshift Missense Missense Nonsense	3 3 2 2 2	G → A G → - G → T G → C G → A	W → stop W → C W → L W → S W → stop	rs1448161781 rs541140024
112	Missense	2	T → C	L → P	rs987960379
136	Frame Shift	3	A → -	A → H	rs1004328462
194	Missense	1 1	G → C G → A	D → H D → N	rs990835413
209	Nonsense	1	C → T	Q → stop	rs906917531
228	Frame Shift	1	G → -	D → T	rs1434673805
235	Frame Shift	3	+ C	T → H	rs149217587
272	Missense Nonsense	1	G → A G → T	E → K E → stop	rs186899872
