= Centrosomal protein 15 =

CEP15

Identifiers
- Aliases: CEP15, chromosome 3 open reading frame 14, HT021, C3orf14, Centrosomal protein 15
- External IDs: MGI: 5589433; GeneCards: CEP15

Gene location (Human)
Chr.	Chromosome 3 (human)
Band	3p14.2	Start	62,319,015 bp
Band	3p14.2	End	62,336,213 bp
RNA expression pattern
Bgee	Human / Mouse (ortholog); Top expressed in: pons; endothelial cell; ganglionic eminence; middle temporal gyrus; lateral nuclear group of thalamus; orbitofrontal cortex; superior vestibular nucleus; pars compacta; Brodmann area 23; amygdala / n/a; More reference expression data
BioGPS	n/a
Orthologs
Databases	NCBI: entry; OMA: entry
Species	Human	Mouse
Entrez	57415	102632117
Ensembl	ENSG00000114405	n/a
UniProt	Q9HBI5	n/a
RefSeq (mRNA)	NM_001291941; NM_001291942; NM_001291943; NM_020685	n/a
RefSeq (protein)	NP_001278870; NP_001278871; NP_001278872; NP_065736	n/a
Location (UCSC)	Chr 3: 62.32 – 62.34 Mb	n/a
PubMed search
- Wikidata
View/Edit Human	View/Edit Mouse

Centrosomal protein 15 is a protein of uncertain function which in humans is encoded by the gene CEP15 (previously C3orf14). The human gene is located at 3p14.2 near the fragile site FRBA3—which falls between this gene and the centromere. Its protein is expected to localize to the nucleus and bind DNA. Orthologs have been identified in all of the major animal groups, minus amphibians and insects, tracing as far back as the sea anemone; indicating an origin of over 1000 mya, highlighting its importance in the animal genome.

== Gene aliases ==
CEP15 is also known by the aliases C3orf14, LOC57415, FLJ94553 and FLJ17473.

== Structure ==
The mRNA is composed of 6 exons, and encodes a 15007.84 kD protein known as HT021. This protein has a pre-modification isoelectric point of 5.57 and alpha helices span most of its length. Four sites of possible phosphorylation have been identified, and at least two sites of phosphorylation are conserved in all orthologs, as are two alpha helices. This protein is also predicted as a DNA binding protein. The protein may assume a tertiary structure of a coiled coil.

== Homology ==
Orthologs of this gene has been identified in most animal groups: mammals, monotremes, aves, reptiles, fish and invertebrates. Transcripts have not been identified in amphibians or insects; however only model organisms have been sequenced from these groups. Very recently the first ortholog in reptiles was identified in Anolis carolinensis. The amino acid structure is highly conserved through mammals, and the secondary and tertiary structure is highly conserved in all orthologs, dating as far back as 1000 mya in the sea anemone. No orthologs have been found in plants or bacteria. Below is a phylogenetic tree generated in SDSC Biology Workbench showing protein similarity among species in which CEP15 has been identified.

== Expression ==
This gene was first identified in the hypothalamic-pituitary-adrenal axis (HPA axis). The GEO and EST profiles in NCBI, indicate that its expression level varies from tissue to tissue; however its reported expression is 1.2 times that of the average gene. It has highest expression in the pancreas and nervous tissue (in humans). It is underexpressed in many cancer cell lines, however this may be due to its close proximity to the tumor suppressor gene FHIT, and the chromosomal fragile site FRBA3. Breakage at this site inactivates FHIT and can lead to the loss of CEP15.
