= Chromosomal fragile site =

Cytogenetic feature

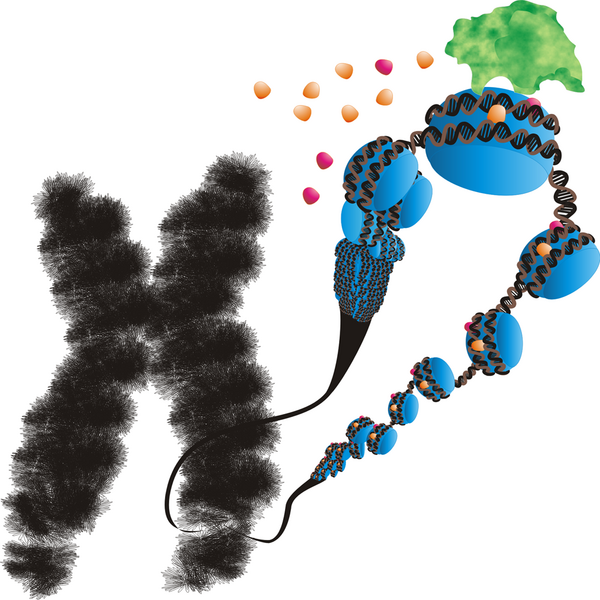
Silencing of the FMR1 gene in Fragile X syndrome. FMR1 co-localizes with a rare fragile site, visible here as a gap on the long arms of the X chromosome.

A chromosomal fragile site is a specific heritable point on a chromosome that tends to form a gap or constriction and may tend to break when the cell is exposed to partial replication stress. Based on their frequency, fragile sites are classified as "common" or "rare". To date, more than 120 fragile sites have been identified in the human genome.

Common fragile sites are considered part of normal chromosome structure and are present in all (or nearly all) individuals in a population. Under normal conditions, most common fragile sites are not prone to spontaneous breaks. Common fragile sites are of interest in cancer studies because they are frequently affected in cancer and they can be found in healthy individuals. Sites FRA3B (harboring the FHIT gene) and FRA16D (harboring the WWOX gene) are two well known examples and have been a major focus of research.

Rare fragile sites are found in less than 5% of the population, and are often composed of two- or three-nucleotide repeats. They are often susceptible to spontaneous breakage during replication, frequently affecting neighboring genes. Clinically, the most important rare fragile site is FRAXA in the FMR1 gene, which is associated with the fragile X syndrome, the most common cause of hereditary intellectual disability.

For a database of fragile sites in human chromosomes, see

== Rare fragile sites ==
=== Classification ===
Rare fragile sites (RFSs) are classified into two sub-groups based on the compounds that elicit breakage: folate-sensitive groups (for examples, see), and nonfolate-sensitive groups, which are induced by bromodeoxyuridine (BrdU) or distamycin A, an antibiotic that preferentially binds to AT-pairs of DNA. The folate-sensitive group is characterized by an expansion of CGG repeats, while the nonfolate-sensitive group contains many AT-rich minisatellite repeats.

=== Mechanisms of instability ===
The CGG and AT-rich repeats characteristic of RFSs can form hairpins and other non-B DNA structures that block replication forks and can result in breakage. DNA polymerase has been shown to pause at CTG and CGG triplet repeat sequences, which can result in continual expansion via slippage.

== Common fragile sites ==
=== Classification ===
Unlike RFSs, common fragile sites (CFSs) are not the result of nucleotide repeat expansion mutations. They are a part of the normal human genome and are typically stable when not under replicative stress. The majority of breakages at CFSs are induced by low doses of the antibiotic aphidicolin (APH). Co-treatment with low concentrations of the topoisomerase I inhibitor, camptothecin (CPT), reduces APH-induced breakage. CFS regions are highly conserved in mouse and other species, including primates, cat, dog, pig, horse, cow, Indian mole rat, and yeast (for review, see). While CFSs could be a result of higher-order chromosome structure, the conservation throughout species could also indicate that they may have some conserved biological purpose.

=== Mechanisms of instability ===
The instability of CFSs is proposed to stem from late replication: CFSs are likely to initiate proper replication but slow to complete it, introducing breaks from unreplicated regions of DNA. Late-replication may be a result of formation of non-B DNA structures like hairpins and toroids that stall the replication fork in AT rich regions, analogous to the proposed mechanism of rare fragile site instability. Ataxia-telangiectasia and Rad3 Related (ATR) checkpoint kinase is required for maintaining stability of CFS under both stressed and normal replicating conditions. Breakage is reduced after treatment with CPT (camptothecin) (without APH), signifying that CPT also has a necessary role in stabilizing CFSs.

== Clinical relevance ==
Fragile sites are associated with numerous disorders and diseases, both heritable and not. The FRAXA site is perhaps most famous for its role in Fragile X syndrome, but fragile sites are clinically implicated in many other important diseases, such as cancer.

FRA3B and FRA16D lie within the large tumor-suppressor genes, FHIT and WWOX, respectively. High frequency of deletions at breakpoints within these fragile sites has been associated with many cancers, including breast, lung, and gastric cancers (for review, see )

MicroRNA genes, which are preferentially involved in chromosomal alterations, are frequently located at fragile sites. Chromosomal alterations may lead to deregulation of microRNA, which could be of diagnostic and prognostic significance for cancers.

Additionally, the Hepatitis B virus (HBV) and HPV-16 virus, the strain of human papilloma virus most likely to produce cancer, appear to integrate preferentially in or around fragile sites, and it has been proposed that this is crucial to the development of certain tumors.

Fragile sites have also been implicated in a variety of syndromes (for a review, see). For example, breakage at or near the FRA11b locus has been implicated in Jacobsen syndrome, which is characterized by loss of part of the long arm of chromosome 11 accompanied by mild intellectual disability. The FRAXE site is associated in the development of a form of intellectual disability without any distinctive phenotypic features. Seckel syndrome, a genetic disease characterized by low levels of ATR, results in increased instability of chromosomes at fragile sites.

== Fragile sites and affected genes ==
- FRA1A
- FRA1B (DAB1 gene)
- FRA1C
- FRA1D
- FRA1E (DPYD gene)
- FRA1F
- FRA1G
- FRA1H
- FRA1I
- FRA1J
- FRA1K
- FRA1L
- FRA1M
- FRA2A
- FRA2B
- FRA2C
- FRA2D
- FRA2E
- FRA2F (LRP1B gene)
- FRA2G
- FRA2H
- FRA2I
- FRA2J
- FRA2K
- FRA2L
- FRA3A
- FRA3B (FHIT gene)
- FRA3C (NAALADL2 gene)
- FRA3D
- FRA4A
- FRA4B
- FRA4C
- FRA4D
- FRA4E
- FRA4F (GRID2 gene)
- FRA5A
- FRA5B
- FRA5C
- FRA5D
- FRA5E
- FRA5F
- FRA5G
- FRA5H (PDE4D gene)
- FRA6A
- FRA6B
- FRA6C
- FRA6D
- FRA6E (PARK2 gene)
- FRA6F
- FRA6G
- FRA6H
- FRA7A
- FRA7B
- FRA7C
- FRA7D
- FRA7E
- FRA7F
- FRA7G
- FRA7H
- FRA7I (CNTNAP2 gene)
- FRA7J
- FRA7K (IMMP2L gene)
- FRA8A
- FRA8B
- FRA8C
- FRA8D
- FRA8E
- FRA8F
- FRA9A
- FRA9B
- FRA9C
- FRA9D
- FRA9E
- FRA9F
- FRA9G
- FRA10A
- FRA10B
- FRA10C
- FRA10D (CTNNA3 gene)
- FRA10E
- FRA10F
- FRA10G
- FRA11A
- FRA11B
- FRA11C
- FRA11D
- FRA11E
- FRA112F (DLG2 gene)
- FRA11G
- FRA11H
- FRA11I
- FRA12A
- FRA12B
- FRA12C
- FRA12D
- FRA12E
- FRA13A (NBEA gene)
- FRA13B
- FRA13C
- FRA13D
- FRA13E
- FRA14B (GPHN gene)
- FRA14C
- FRA15A (RORA gene)
- FRA16A
- FRA16B
- FRA16C
- FRA16D (WWOX gene)
- FRA16E
- FRA17A
- FRA17B
- FRA18A
- FRA18B
- FRA18C
- FRA19A
- FRA19B
- FRA20A
- FRA20B
- FRA22A
- FRA22B
- FRAXB
- FRAXC (IL1RAPL1/DMD genes)
- FRAXD
- FRAXA
- FRAXE
- FRAXF
