= ERCC excision repair 6 like, spindle assembly checkpoint helicase =

Protein-coding gene in the species Homo sapiens

ERCC6L

Identifiers
- Aliases: ERCC6L, PICH, RAD26L, excision repair cross-complementation group 6 like, ERCC excision repair 6 like, spindle assembly checkpoint helicase
- External IDs: OMIM: 300687; MGI: 2654144; GeneCards: ERCC6L
Enzyme activity
EC #	BRENDA	ExPASy	KEGG	MetaCyc
3.6.4.12	↗	↗	↗	↗

Gene location (Human)
Chr.	X chromosome (human)
Band	Xq13.1	Start	72,204,657 bp
Band	Xq13.1	End	72,239,027 bp

Gene location (Mouse)
Chr.	X chromosome (mouse)
Band	X|X D	Start	101,185,322 bp
Band	X|X D	End	101,200,697 bp
RNA expression pattern
Bgee	Human / Mouse (ortholog); Top expressed in: secondary oocyte; gonad; ventricular zone; testicle; embryo; ganglionic eminence; stromal cell of endometrium; trabecular bone; bone marrow; mucosa of transverse colon / Top expressed in: primary oocyte; zygote; secondary oocyte; tail of embryo; genital tubercle; epiblast; primitive streak; maxillary prominence; ureter; abdominal wall; More reference expression data
BioGPS	n/a
Gene ontology
Molecular function	DNA binding; nucleotide binding; helicase activity; protein binding; hydrolase activity; ATP binding; DNA translocase activity
Cellular component	cytosol; membrane; chromosome; chromosome, centromeric region; kinetochore
Biological process	cell division; cell cycle; sister chromatid cohesion
Sources:Amigo / QuickGO
Orthologs
Databases	NCBI: entry; OMA: entry
Species	Human	Mouse
Entrez	54821	236930
Ensembl	ENSG00000186871	ENSMUSG00000051220
UniProt	Q2NKX8	Q8BHK9
RefSeq (mRNA)	NM_017669; NM_001009954	NM_146235
RefSeq (protein)	NP_060139; NP_001009954	NP_666347
Location (UCSC)	Chr X: 72.2 – 72.24 Mb	Chr X: 101.19 – 101.2 Mb
PubMed search
- Wikidata
View/Edit Human	View/Edit Mouse

ERCC excision repair 6 like, spindle assembly checkpoint helicase is a protein that in humans is encoded by the ERCC6L gene.

== Function ==
This gene encodes a member of the SWItch/Sucrose Non-Fermentable (SWI/SNF2) family of proteins, and contains a SNF2-like ATPase domain and a PICH family domain. One distinguishing feature of this SWI/SNF protein family member is that during interphase, the protein is excluded from the nucleus, and only associates with chromatin after the nuclear envelope has broken down. This protein is a DNA translocase that is thought to bind double-stranded DNA that is exposed to stretching forces, such as those exerted by the mitotic spindle. This protein associates with ribosomal DNA and ultra-fine DNA bridges (UFBs), fine structures that connect sister chromatids during anaphase at some sites such as fragile sites, telomeres and centromeres. This gene is required for the faithful segregation of sister chromatids during mitosis, and the ATPase activity of this protein required for the resolution of UFBs before cytokinesis.
