= WOREE syndrome =

Rare genetic developmental disease

WWOX-related epileptic encephalopathy, also known as WOREE syndrome, is a rare genetic developmental disorder. Its effects include drug-resistant epilepsy, developmental delay, ataxia, and premature death at ages 2-4 years. It is one of several disorders that can be caused by defects in the WWOX gene.

It is a rare disease, with only 60 cases having been identified as of 2023.
