= TBL1XR1 =

WD40-repeat-containing protein

Identifiers
- Aliases: TBL1XR1, C21, DC42, IRA1, TBLR1, MRD41, transducin (beta)-like 1 X-linked receptor 1, transducin beta like 1 X-linked receptor 1, TBL1X receptor 1
- External IDs: OMIM: 608628; MGI: 2441730; GeneCards: TBL1XR1
Available structures
PDB	Ortholog search: PDBe RCSB
PDB	List of PDB id codes 4LG9

Gene location (Human)
Chr.	Chromosome 3 (human)
Band	3q26.32	Start	177,019,340 bp
Band	3q26.32	End	177,228,000 bp

Gene location (Mouse)
Chr.	Chromosome 3 (mouse)
Band	3|3 A3	Start	22,130,816 bp
Band	3|3 A3	End	22,270,758 bp
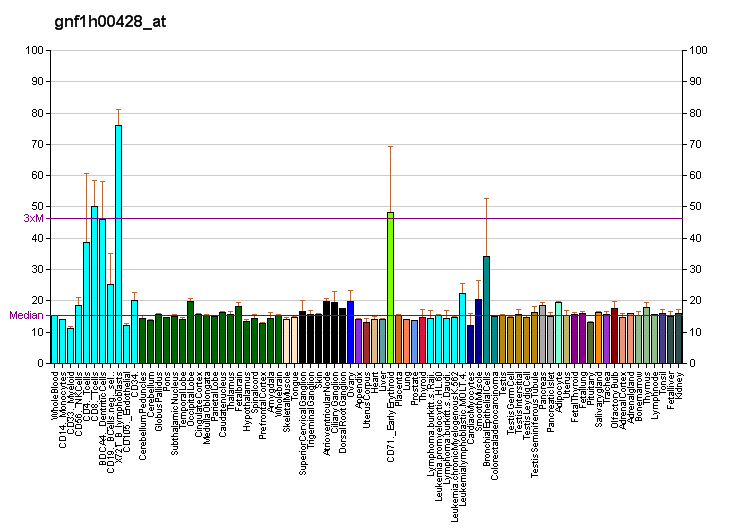

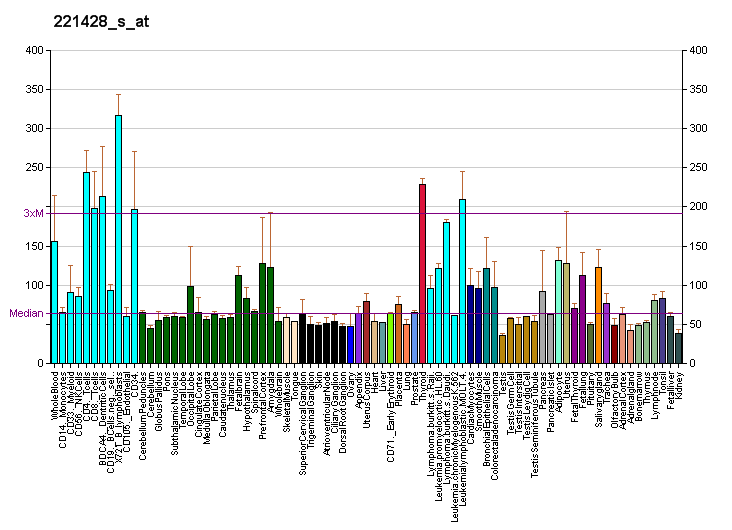
RNA expression pattern
Bgee	Human / Mouse (ortholog); Top expressed in: Achilles tendon; nipple; tibia; corpus callosum; lactiferous duct; visceral pleura; Brodmann area 23; parietal pleura; germinal epithelium; pylorus / Top expressed in: granulocyte; blood; zygote; calvaria; tibiofemoral joint; ankle; cumulus cell; extensor digitorum longus muscle; thymus; lymph node; More reference expression data
BioGPS	More reference expression data
Gene ontology
Molecular function	DNA binding; beta-catenin binding; transcription corepressor activity; protein N-terminus binding; histone binding; protein binding
Cellular component	histone deacetylase complex; transcription repressor complex; nucleoplasm; spindle microtubule; nucleus; mitotic spindle
Biological process	fat pad development; response to dietary excess; regulation of transcription, DNA-templated; multicellular organism growth; negative regulation of transcription by RNA polymerase II; transcription, DNA-templated; positive regulation of transcription, DNA-templated; lipid catabolic process; regulation of triglyceride metabolic process; white fat cell differentiation; regulation of gene expression; adipose tissue development; negative regulation of transcription, DNA-templated; histone deacetylation; positive regulation of transcription by RNA polymerase II; proteasome-mediated ubiquitin-dependent protein catabolic process; regulation of lipid metabolic process; positive regulation of canonical Wnt signaling pathway; chromatin organization; blastocyst hatching; regulation of transcription by RNA polymerase II
Sources:Amigo / QuickGO
Orthologs
Databases	NCBI: entry; OMA: entry
Species	Human	Mouse
Entrez	79718	81004
Ensembl	ENSG00000177565	ENSMUSG00000027630
UniProt	Q9BZK7	Q8BHJ5
RefSeq (mRNA)	NM_024665; NM_001321193; NM_001321194; NM_001321195; NM_001374327 NM_001374328; NM_001374329; NM_001374330	NM_030732
RefSeq (protein)	NP_001308122; NP_001308123; NP_001308124; NP_078941; NP_001361256 NP_001361257; NP_001361258; NP_001361259	NP_109657
Location (UCSC)	Chr 3: 177.02 – 177.23 Mb	Chr 3: 22.13 – 22.27 Mb
PubMed search
- Wikidata
View/Edit Human	View/Edit Mouse

F-box-like/WD repeat-containing protein TBL1XR1 is a protein that in humans is encoded by the TBL1XR1 gene. The protein encoded by this gene has sequence similarity with members of the WD40 repeat-containing protein family. The WD40 group is a large family of proteins that appear to have a regulatory function. It is believed that the WD40 repeats mediate protein–protein interactions, and members of the family are involved in signal transduction, RNA processing, gene regulation, vesicular trafficking, cytoskeletal assembly and may play a role in the control of cytotypic differentiation.

== Clinical significance ==
Mutations in TBL1XR1 cause Pierpont syndrome, which involves intellectual disability, a characteristic facial appearance and limb abnormalities.

Mutations in TBL1XR1 have been identified in lymphomas, including MYD88 wild-type Waldenstrom's macroglobulinemia.

In prostate cancer, somatic copy-number gains (CNA) in TBL1XR1 are present in around 15% of patients with localised disease, co-occurring with adjacent megagene NAALADL2. The frequency of CNA gains in these genes associate with a number of clinical features of aggressive prostate cancer including high Gleason grade, tumour stage, positive surgical margins and cancer which has spread to the lymph nodes. The frequency of copy-number gains in this genetic region also increase in castrate resistant and neuroendocrine prostate cancer.

The region surrounding TBL1XR1 is rich in oncogenes. Copy-number gains in TBL1XR1 often co-occur with neighbouring oncogenes including: BCL6, ATR and PI3K family members. Copy-number gains at the DNA level associate with mRNA expression changes in more than 450 known oncogenes, suggesting this region may be important in driving aggressive prostate cancer. TBL1XR1 is a co-activator of the androgen receptor, a major hormone receptor driving prostate cancer development. Of the genes whose expression was altered between patients with and without gains, 506 (14.09%) of the genes were androgen-regulated or contained an AR binding site.

== Interactions ==
TBL1XR1 has been shown to interact with nuclear receptor co-repressor 1.
