= NAALADL2 =

Identifiers
- Aliases: NAALADL2, N-acetylated alpha-linked acidic dipeptidase like 2
- External IDs: OMIM: 608806; MGI: 2685867; GeneCards: NAALADL2

Gene location (Human)
Chr.	Chromosome 3 (human)
Band	3q26.31	Start	174,438,573 bp
Band	3q26.31	End	175,810,548 bp

Gene location (Mouse)
Chr.	Chromosome 3 (mouse)
Band	3|3 A3	Start	23,852,266 bp
Band	3|3 A3	End	25,198,425 bp
RNA expression pattern
Bgee	Human / Mouse (ortholog); Top expressed in: Achilles tendon; epithelium of colon; gonad; sural nerve; gallbladder; testicle; stromal cell of endometrium; ventricular zone; smooth muscle tissue; popliteal artery / Top expressed in: Epithelium of choroid plexus; urethra; secondary oocyte; retinal pigment epithelium; conjunctival fornix; zygote; primary oocyte; embryo; sciatic nerve; vestibular labyrinth; More reference expression data
BioGPS	n/a
Gene ontology
Molecular function	protein binding
Cellular component	membrane; integral component of membrane; nucleoplasm
Biological process	response to bacterium
Sources:Amigo / QuickGO
Orthologs
Databases	NCBI: entry; OMA: entry
Species	Human	Mouse
Entrez	254827	635702
Ensembl	ENSG00000177694	ENSMUSG00000102758
UniProt	Q58DX5; Q6H9J7	A0A0N4SUJ3
RefSeq (mRNA)	NM_207015	NM_001326288
RefSeq (protein)	NP_996898	NP_001313217
Location (UCSC)	Chr 3: 174.44 – 175.81 Mb	Chr 3: 23.85 – 25.2 Mb
PubMed search
- Wikidata
View/Edit Human	View/Edit Mouse

N-Acetylated Alpha-Linked Acidic Dipeptidase Like 2 (NAALADL2) is a protein that is encoded by the gene NAALADL2 in humans. NAALADL2 shares 25%–26% sequence identity and 45% sequence similarity with the glutamate carboxypeptidase II family which includes prostate cancer marker PSMA (FOLH1/NAALAD1). The NAALADL2 gene is a giant gene spanning 1.37 Mb which is approximately 49 times larger than the average gene size of 28 kb. Gene length is correlated with the number of transcript variants of a gene, as such, NAALADL2 undergoes extensive alternative splicing and has 12 splice variants as defined by Ensembl.

== Function ==
The current function of NAALADL2 is unknown. NAALADL2 shows significant homology to N-acetylated alpha-linked acidic dipeptidase and transferrin receptors. While sharing some homology with the M28B metallopeptidase family, NAALADL2 does not possess favoured amino acids at certain key positions that are highly conserved, and important for metallopeptidase function, which may imply it is catalytically inactive.

== Clinical significance ==
NAALADL2 has been shown to be severed by a Cornelia De Lange-associated translocation breakpoint at 3q26.3.

The rs17531088 SNP in NAALADL2 was shown to be associated with Kawasaki disease in a large GWAS comprising two independent cohorts totalling 893 KD cases plus population and family controls.

=== Cancer ===
NAALADL2 has been shown to have a role in prostate cancer. NAALADL2 protein expression is associated with prostate tumour stage and grade with mRNA expression predicting poor survival following radical prostatectomy in a small cohort. Overexpression of NAALADL2 in cell lines subsequently altered binding to extracellular matrix (ECM) components and enhanced the invasive capacity of prostate cancer cells. When NAALADL2 expression was artificially increased in cell lines, genes involved in the cell cycle, cell adhesion, epithelial to mesenchymal transition and cytoskeletal remodelling were altered. These results suggest NAALADL2 may act to drive aggressive prostate cancer.

A genome-wide association study (GWAS) of 12,518 prostate cancer cases found a SNP; rs78943174, within the 3q26.31 (NAALADL2) locus associated with high Gleason sum score. A second study of SNPs occurring within common transcription factor binding sites identified the SNP; rs10936845 within a GATA2 motif. This SNP increased the expression of NAALADL2 expression in prostate cancer patients, with increased expression also predicting biochemical recurrence.

In prostate cancer, somatic copy-number gains in NAALADL2 are present in around 16% of patients with localised disease, increasing to 30% of Gleason grade 5 disease, and 50% of T stage 4 disease. co-occurring with adjacent oncogene TBL1XR1. The frequency of CNA gains in NAALADL2 associate with a number of clinical hallmarks of aggressive prostate cancer including Gleason grade, tumour stage, positive surgical margins and cancer which has spread to the lymph nodes. The frequency of copy-number gains in this genetic region also increase in castrate resistant and neuroendocrine prostate cancer. The region surrounding NAALADL2 is rich in oncogenes. Copy-number gains in NAALADL2 often co-occur with neighbouring oncogenes including: BCL6, ATR and PI3K family members. Copy-number gains at the DNA level associate with mRNA expression changes in more than 450 known oncogenes, suggesting this region may be important in driving aggressive prostate cancer.

A study of metastatic castrate resistant prostate cancer (mCRPC) has found the antisense strand of NAALADL2 (NAALADL2-AS2) to be more than 2-fold higher in patients with mCRPC compared with healthy volunteers. Patients with higher NAALADL2-AS2 expression had an improved response to enzalutamide compared to those with lower expression.

In breast cancer, multicellular tumor spheroids (MTS) are 3D cell cultures which acquire differentiated cell-cell junctions and a defined microenvironment, differentially expressing a number of adhesion molecules such as EPCAM, E-cadherin, integrins and syndecans when compared to 2D monocultures. NAALADL2 has been shown to be differentially expressed in MTS when compared to 2D cultures. These results support a role of NAALADL2 in cell-cell interactions and agree with evidence in prostate cancer which find NAALADL2 affects cell-ECM interactions.

SNP's in NAALADL2 have also been identified in cancer risk GWAS's for breast cancer and Lung cancer.

=== Fragile site ===
It has been shown that the gene encoding NAALADL2 is located within a fragile site, a genomic loci prone to breakage and subsequent repair. In cancer, the fragile site located within NAALADL2 has been recently shown to be the fifth most altered of all fragile sites. Therefore, it has been suggested that the copy-number gains in NAALADL2 and gains in surrounding oncogenes such as GATA2, PIK3CB, ATR, SMC4, TBL1XR1, SOX2 and MUC4 may likely arise due to breakage and attempted genomic repair in this region. Upon a break in this fragile site, through a process known as the fork stalling and template switching (FoSTeS), extra copies of the genes in the region surrounding the break may be duplicated. Extra copies (copy-number gains) of NAALADL2 and the genes which surround it have been shown to increase the mRNA expression of these genes, leading to further dysregulation and activation of cancer-associated pathways involved in growth and proliferation.
