= TMEM171 =

Protein-coding gene in the species Homo sapiens

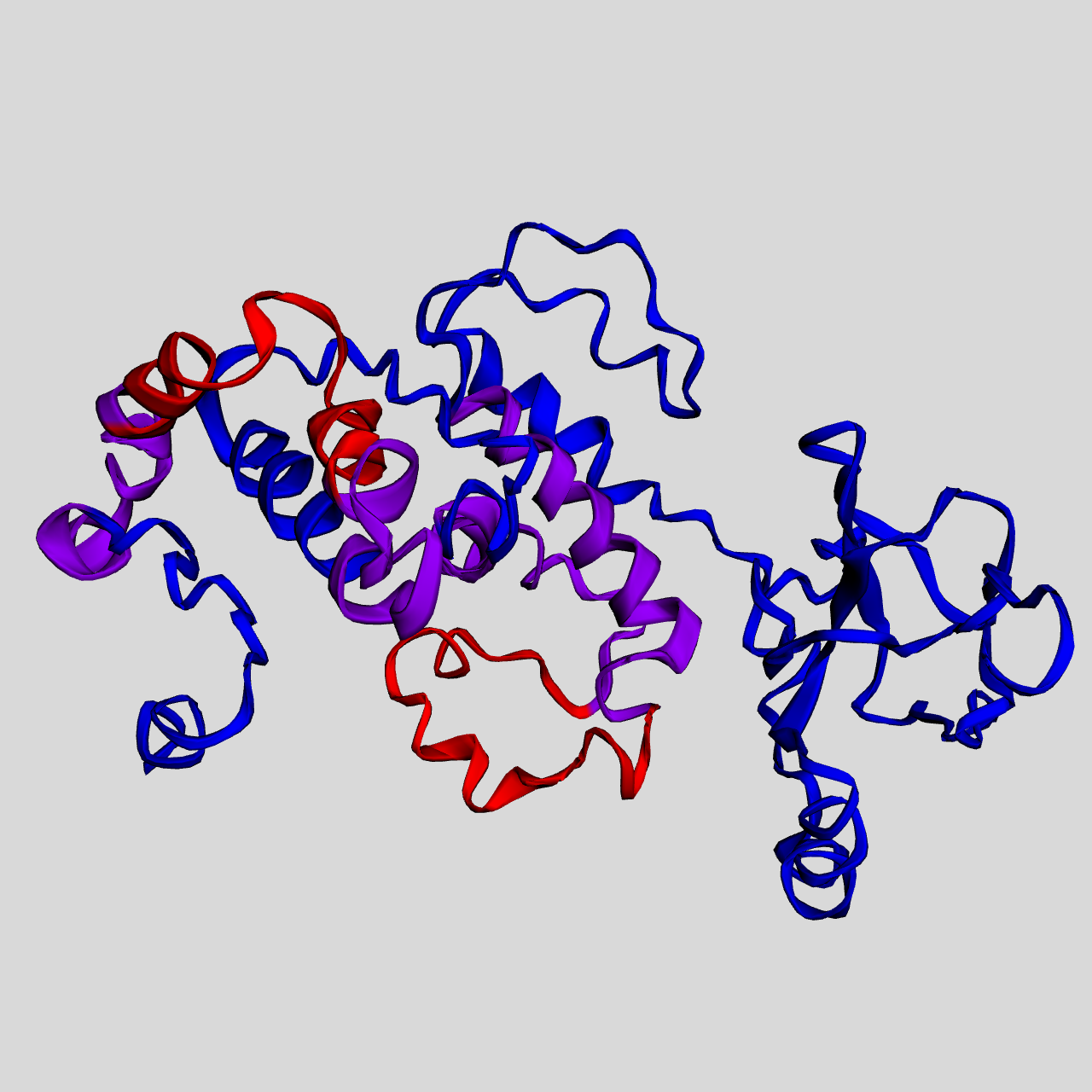

Identifiers
- Aliases: TMEM171, PRP2, transmembrane protein 171
- External IDs: MGI: 2685751; GeneCards: TMEM171

Gene location (Human)
Chr.	Chromosome 5 (human)
Band	5q13.2	Start	73,120,569 bp
Band	5q13.2	End	73,131,809 bp

Gene location (Mouse)
Chr.	Chromosome 13 (mouse)
Band	13|13 D1	Start	98,822,743 bp
Band	13|13 D1	End	98,831,342 bp
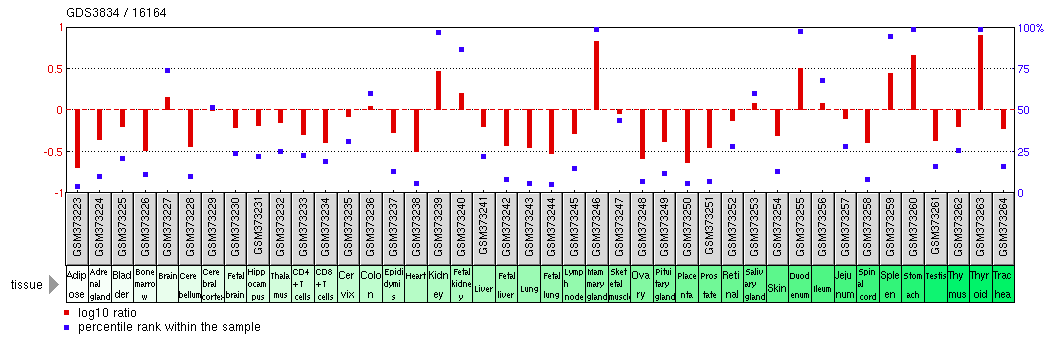
RNA expression pattern
Bgee	Human / Mouse (ortholog); Top expressed in: mucosa of transverse colon; rectum; oocyte; mucosa of ileum; pancreatic epithelial cell; left lobe of thyroid gland; right lobe of thyroid gland; pancreatic ductal cell; mucosa of sigmoid colon; secondary oocyte / Top expressed in: interventricular septum; zygote; secondary oocyte; large intestine; colon; right kidney; epithelium of stomach; left colon; blastocyst; embryo; More reference expression data
BioGPS	More reference expression data
Orthologs
Databases	NCBI: entry; OMA: entry
Species	Human	Mouse
Entrez	134285	380863
Ensembl	ENSG00000157111	ENSMUSG00000052485
UniProt	Q8WVE6	Q4KL18
RefSeq (mRNA)	NM_001161342; NM_173490	NM_001025606; NM_001373965
RefSeq (protein)	NP_001154814; NP_775761	NP_001020777; NP_001360894
Location (UCSC)	Chr 5: 73.12 – 73.13 Mb	Chr 13: 98.82 – 98.83 Mb
PubMed search
- Wikidata
View/Edit Human	View/Edit Mouse

Transmembrane protein 171 (TMEM171) is a protein that in humans is encoded by the TMEM171 gene.

== Gene ==
=== General properties ===
TMEM171 is also known as PRP2 or proline-rich protein 2. It has 11,526 base pairs and 4 exons and is located on the long arm of chromosome 5, at 5q13.2, in humans. It spans from 73,120,292 to 73,131,817 on the plus strand. It is flanked by FCHO2 and TNPO1 upstream and TMEM174 downstream.

=== Promoter ===
The predicted promoter region (GXP_7598) is 2034 base pairs long and extends past the first exon of TMEM171. Transcription factors predicted to bind to the promoter region include p63 tumor protein, CCCTC binding factors, TATA binding factors, and thyroid hormone receptors.

=== Expression ===
TMEM171 is moderately and differentially expressed, indicating that it is neither a housekeeping gene nor a tissue-enriched gene. Its expression is highest in the thyroid, mammary gland, stomach, duodenum, and kidney. It is also expressed at moderate levels in tissues including the spleen, ileum, colon, salivary gland, and expressed at lower levels in a variety of other tissues. Conditional expression patterns of TMEM171 include decreased expression in papillary thyroid carcinoma, colon cancer, and gastric cancer, as well as increased expression in p63-depleted tissue and induced alveolar macrophages.

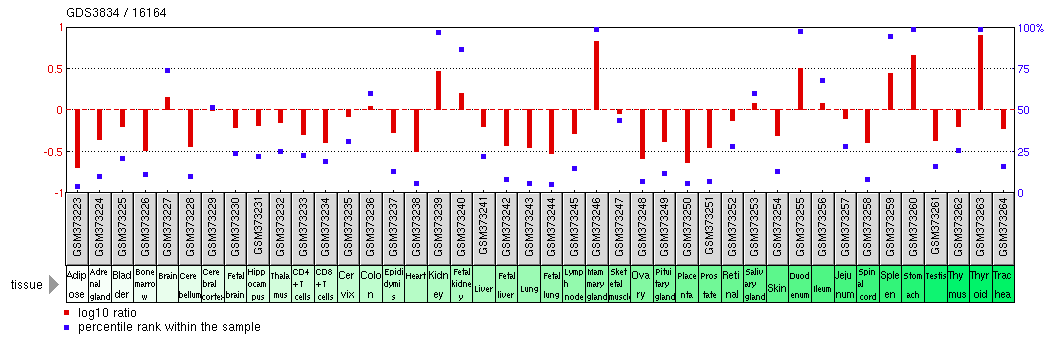
Expression profile of TMEM171 in a selection of normal tissues

== mRNA ==
TMEM171 has isoforms 1, 2, and X1, with 4 exons each. The 3 transcripts undergo alternate in-frame splicing and are translated into proteins with 324, 323, and 305 amino acids, respectively.

=== Rna-binding proteins ===
The 5' untranslated region has predicted sites for binding by SFRS1 and SFRS9 splicing factors and FUS, which couples transcription and splicing. The 3' untranslated region has predicted sites for binding by ELAVL1 and ZFP36, which both bind AU rich elements and may compete to stabilize or destabilize the mRNA.

== Protein ==
=== General properties ===
The longest protein isoform of TMEM171 is 324 amino acids in length and has an observed molecular weight of approximately 44 kDa. TMEM171 is an acidic protein overall, with a predicted isoelectric point of approximately 5.

=== Composition ===
TMEM171 has fewer lysine residues than expected for a human protein. Despite the fact that its alias is proline-rich protein 2, TMEM171 in humans does not have more proline residues than expected; however it does have a multiplet of 6 proline residues. More distant orthologs, including Xenopus tropicalis, do have significantly more proline residues than expected. TMEM171 has 3 hydrophobic segments, which correspond with transmembrane regions.

=== Domains and motifs ===
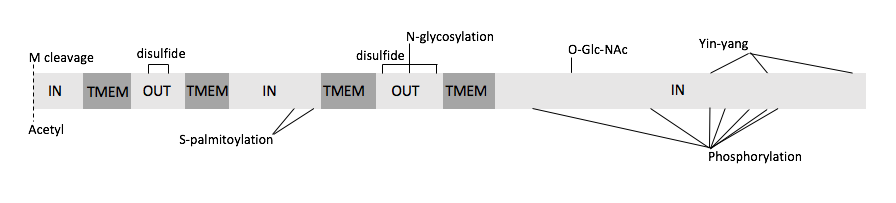
Schematic illustration of TMEM171, with domains and post-translational modifications.

TMEM171 has a conserved domain, pfam15471 (aa4:318), whose structure and function are not yet characterized. Within the domain, there are 4 transmembrane domains, 2 non-cytosolic domains, and 3 cytosolic domains.

=== Structure ===
The structure of TMEM171 consists of approximately 25% beta strands and 15% alpha helices, with coils and disordered regions making up the rest of the structure. The tertiary structure includes 2 predicted disulfide bridges, which occur between highly conserved cysteine residues in the non-cytosolic domains.

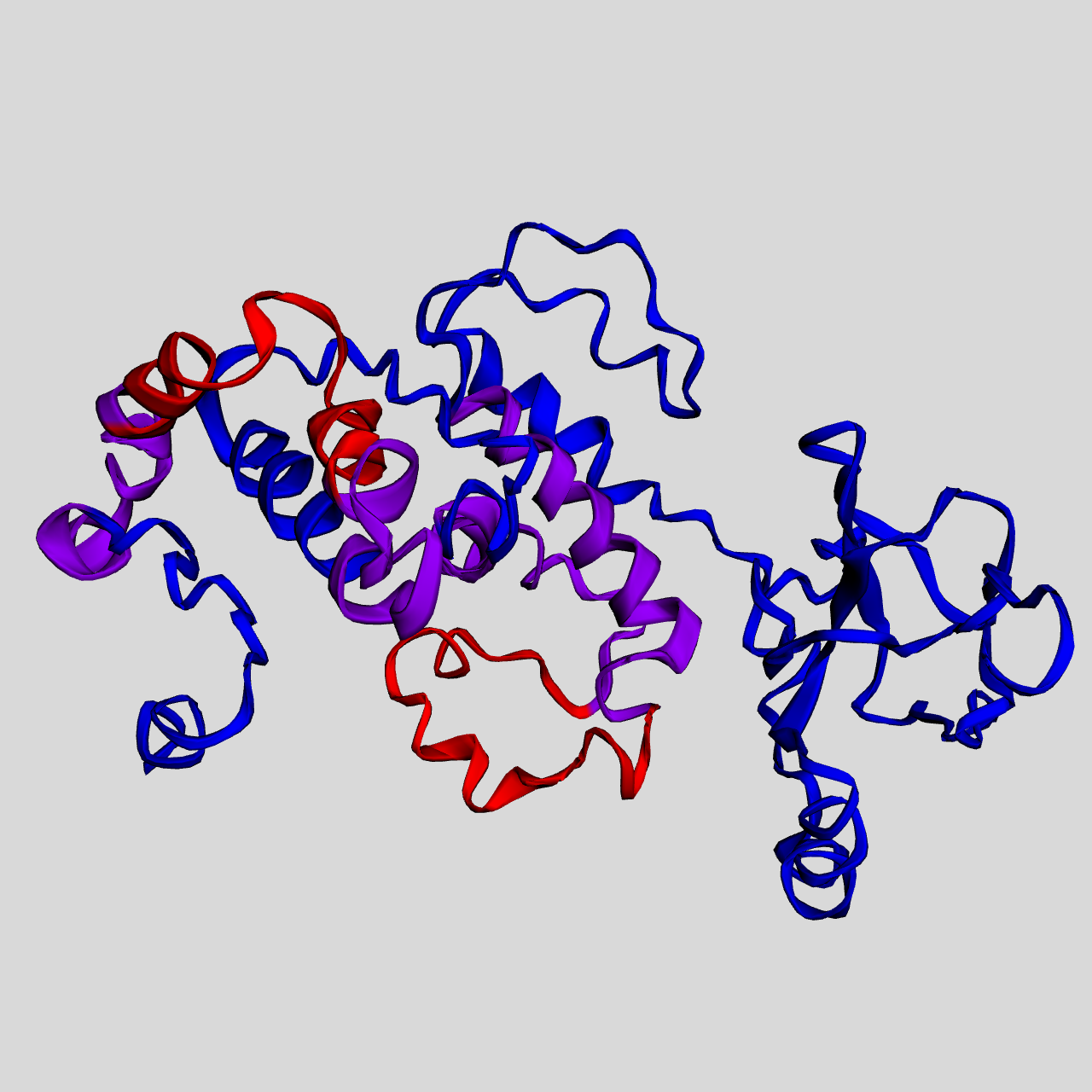
Predicted structure of TMEM171, with 4 transmembrane (purple), 3 cytosolic (blue), and 2 non-cytosolic (red) domains. Predicted by I-TASSER and viewed with EzMol.

=== Post-translational modifications ===
TMEM171 undergoes methionine cleavage and N-terminal acetylation, which is one of the most common modifications of eukaryotic proteins. N-linked glycosylation is predicted at a highly conserved NETD sequence within a non-cytosolic domain. S-palmitoylation, which enhances surface hydrophobicity and membrane affinity, is predicted at 2 cytosolic cysteine residues in TMEM171. TMEM171 is phosphorylated by unspecified kinases at several sites. It also undergoes O-ß-GlcNAc modification at 4 sites, 3 of which are Yin-Yang sites due to O-ß-GlcNAc modification and phosphorylation competing for control of protein activation or deactivation.

Conceptual translation of TMEM171, with predicted post-translational modifications.

=== Localization ===
TMEM171's predicted location is in the plasma membrane, with both the N- and C-termini located inside the cell.

=== Interacting proteins ===
The proteins that are most likely to interact with TMEM171, based on affinity chromatography and two hybrid arrays, are MIER1, EMSY, CHPT1, HDLBP, NEDD4, WWOX, and TTHY3. There is strong evidence for a direct interaction between TMEM171 an MIER1, which is a transcriptional repressor that is associated with central hypothyroidism.

== Clinical significance ==
TMEM171 is down-regulated in papillary thyroid carcinoma and two SNPs, with the non-synonymous mutations R86G and N139K, are identified risk SNPs for papillary thyroid carcinoma. TMEM171 is also down-regulated in gastric cancer and colon cancer. More specifically, it is down-regulated in right-sided colon cancer relative to left-sided colon cancer, which typically has a better prognosis. In renal cancer, high expression of TMEM171 is a favorable prognostic marker. In triple-negative breast cancer cells, immuno-activation by tumor necrosis factor alpha (TNFα) was found to up-regulate TMEM171.

== Evolution ==
TMEM171 has signatures of balancing selection, which include a significant excess of polymorphisms and intermediate-frequency alleles.

=== Homology ===
TMEM171 has no paralogs or paralogous domains. TMEM171 has 208 identified orthologs. All orthologs are vertebrates, including mammals, amphibians, reptiles, birds, lobe-finned fish, and cartilaginous fish. The following table provides a sample of the ortholog space of TMEM171.

Genus and species	NCBI Accession Number	Date of Divergence (MYA)	Sequence length	Sequence identity
Homo sapiens (Human)	NP_775761.4	0	324	100%
Pan troglodytes (Chimpanzee)	XP_009447304.1	6	324	99%
Saimiri boliveiensis (Black-capped squirrel monkey)	XP_010334830.1	42.6	324	91%
Mus musculus (Mouse)	XP_006517772.1	88	323	75%
Myotis lucifugus (Little brown bat)	XP_006081400.1	94	325	82%
Vulpes vulpes (Fox)	XP_025838976.1	94	321	73%
Chrysochloris asiatica (Cape golden mole)	XP_006875335.1	102	326	73%
Sarcophilus harrisii (Tasmanian devil)	XP_003759514.1	160	332	67%
Empidonax traillii (Willow flycatcher)	XP_027739189.1	320	333	52%
Anas platyrhynchos (Mallard)	XP_027302666.1	320	330	47%
Xenopus tropicalis (Western clawed frog)	XP_012815192.1	353	332	54%
Rhincodon typus (Whale shark)	XP_020374629.1	465	311	36%
Callorhinchus milii (Australian ghost shark; Elephant fish)	XP_007898003.1	465	293	31%
