= IMMP2L =

Protein-coding gene in the species Homo sapiens

Identifiers
- Aliases: IMMP2L, IMMP2L-IT1, IMP2, IMP2-LIKE, inner mitochondrial membrane peptidase subunit 2
- External IDs: OMIM: 605977; MGI: 2135611; HomoloGene: 6607; GeneCards: IMMP2L; OMA:IMMP2L - orthologs

Gene location (Human)
Chr.	Chromosome 7 (human)
Band	7q31.1	Start	110,662,644 bp
Band	7q31.1	End	111,562,517 bp

Gene location (Mouse)
Chr.	Chromosome 12 (mouse)
Band	12|12 B1	Start	41,074,089 bp
Band	12|12 B1	End	42,002,371 bp
RNA expression pattern
Bgee	Human / Mouse (ortholog); Top expressed in: tibialis anterior muscle; deltoid muscle; Achilles tendon; quadriceps femoris muscle; testicle; vastus lateralis muscle; gonad; Skeletal muscle tissue of biceps brachii; human kidney; tibial arteries / Top expressed in: spermatid; brown adipose tissue; intercostal muscle; seminiferous tubule; spermatocyte; left lobe of liver; interventricular septum; myocardium of ventricle; right ventricle; tunica adventitia of aorta; More reference expression data
BioGPS	n/a
Gene ontology
Molecular function	peptidase activity; serine-type peptidase activity; hydrolase activity
Cellular component	integral component of membrane; membrane; mitochondrion; mitochondrial inner membrane; mitochondrial inner membrane peptidase complex
Biological process	blood circulation; protein processing involved in protein targeting to mitochondrion; proteolysis; cellular response to DNA damage stimulus; brain development; mitochondrial respiratory chain complex assembly; spermatogenesis; ovarian follicle development; respiratory electron transport chain; cerebellum vasculature development; ovulation; superoxide metabolic process; signal peptide processing
Sources:Amigo / QuickGO
Orthologs
Species	Human	Mouse
Entrez	83943	93757
Ensembl	ENSG00000184903	ENSMUSG00000056899
UniProt	Q96T52	Q8BPT6
RefSeq (mRNA)	NM_001244606; NM_032549; NM_001350959; NM_001350960; NM_001350961 NM_001350962; NM_001350963; NM_001350964	NM_053122
RefSeq (protein)	NP_001231535; NP_115938; NP_001337888; NP_001337889; NP_001337890 NP_001337891; NP_001337892; NP_001337893	NP_444352
Location (UCSC)	Chr 7: 110.66 – 111.56 Mb	Chr 12: 41.07 – 42 Mb
PubMed search
- Wikidata
View/Edit Human	View/Edit Mouse

Inner mitochondrial membrane peptidase subunit 2 (IMMP2L) is an enzyme that in humans is encoded by the IMMP2L gene on chromosome 7. This protein catalyzes the removal of transit peptides required for the targeting of proteins from the mitochondrial matrix, across the inner membrane, into the intermembrane space. IMMP2L processes the nuclear encoded protein DIABLO.

== Structure ==
=== Gene ===
The gene IMMP2L encodes protein inner mitochondrial membrane peptidase subunit 2 in human. The human IMMP2L gene has 18 exons and locates at chromosome band 7q31.

=== Protein ===
The human protein inner mitochondrial membrane peptidase subunit 2 has two isoforms due to alternative splicing. One isoform is 19.7 kDa in size and composed of 175 amino acids. The calculated theoretical pI of this protein isoform is 8.66. The other isoform is 12.3 kDa in size and composed of 110 amino acids. The calculated theoretical pI of this protein isoform is 9.42.

== Function ==
As a peptidase, this protein catalyzes the removal of transit peptides required for the targeting of proteins from the mitochondrial matrix, across the inner membrane, into the intermembrane space. it is known to process the nuclear encoding DIABLO protein.

== Clinical significance ==
Tourette's syndrome is a complex neuropsychiatric disorder characterized by multiple motor and phonic tics. In the clinical characterization of a patient with Tourette's, Petek et al. discovered a breakpoint in chromosome region 7q31. Additional characterization identified that IMMP2L, a novel gene coding for the apparent human homologue of the yeast mitochondrial inner membrane peptidase subunit 2, was found to be disrupted by both the breakpoint in the duplicated fragment and the insertion site in 7q31. It is the first association of IMMP2L gene to Tourette syndrome. Recent investigation by Bertelsen et al. further indicated that IMMP2L was one of the genes as a susceptibility factor in disease pathogenesis. Tourette syndrome is often accompanied by comorbidities such as attention deficit hyperactivity disorder and obsessive–compulsive disorder. Tourette syndrome has a complex etiology, and the underlying environmental and genetic factors responsible for this disease are still largely unknown.
