= GPR162 =

Protein-coding gene in the species Homo sapiens

Identifiers
- Aliases: GPR162, A-2, GRCA, G protein-coupled receptor 162
- External IDs: MGI: 1315214; GeneCards: GPR162

Gene location (Human)
Chr.	Chromosome 12 (human)
Band	12p13.31	Start	6,821,624 bp
Band	12p13.31	End	6,829,972 bp

Gene location (Mouse)
Chr.	Chromosome 6 (mouse)
Band	6 F2|6 59.17 cM	Start	124,835,407 bp
Band	6 F2|6 59.17 cM	End	124,840,946 bp
RNA expression pattern
Bgee	Human / Mouse (ortholog); Top expressed in: right hemisphere of cerebellum; right frontal lobe; cingulate gyrus; anterior cingulate cortex; prefrontal cortex; right uterine tube; Brodmann area 9; amygdala; anterior pituitary; nucleus accumbens / Top expressed in: perirhinal cortex; entorhinal cortex; CA3 field; primary visual cortex; dentate gyrus of hippocampal formation granule cell; superior frontal gyrus; cerebellar cortex; neural layer of retina; central gray substance of midbrain; superior colliculus; More reference expression data
BioGPS	n/a
Gene ontology
Molecular function	G protein-coupled receptor activity; signal transducer activity
Cellular component	integral component of membrane; plasma membrane; membrane
Biological process	G protein-coupled receptor signaling pathway; signal transduction
Sources:Amigo / QuickGO
Orthologs
Databases	NCBI: entry; OMA: entry
Species	Human	Mouse
Entrez	27239	14788
Ensembl	ENSG00000250510	ENSMUSG00000038390
UniProt	Q16538	Q3UN16
RefSeq (mRNA)	NM_019858; NM_014449	NM_013533; NM_001355257
RefSeq (protein)	NP_055264; NP_062832	NP_038561; NP_001342186
Location (UCSC)	Chr 12: 6.82 – 6.83 Mb	Chr 6: 124.84 – 124.84 Mb
PubMed search
- Wikidata
View/Edit Human	View/Edit Mouse

Probable G-protein coupled receptor 162 is a protein that in humans is encoded by the GPR162 gene.

This gene was identified upon genomic analysis of a gene-dense region at human chromosome 12p13. It appears to be mainly expressed in the brain; however, its function is not known. Alternatively spliced transcript variants encoding different isoforms have been identified.
