= LHFPL7 =

Protein-coding gene found in humans

Identifiers
- Aliases: LHFPL7, TMEM211, bA9F11.1, LHFPL tetraspan subfamily member 7, transmembrane protein 211, Q6ICI0
- External IDs: MGI: 2685700; GeneCards: LHFPL7

Gene location (Human)
Chr.	Chromosome 22 (human)
Band	22q11.23	Start	24,935,098 bp
Band	22q11.23	End	24,946,695 bp

Gene location (Mouse)
Chr.	Chromosome 5 (mouse)
Band	5|5 F	Start	113,374,775 bp
Band	5|5 F	End	113,387,129 bp
RNA expression pattern
Bgee	Human / Mouse (ortholog); Top expressed in: testicle; olfactory zone of nasal mucosa; salivary gland; minor salivary glands; gonad; body of stomach; skin of abdomen; skin of leg; cerebellar cortex; cerebellar hemisphere / Top expressed in: embryo; esophagus; stomach; More reference expression data
BioGPS	n/a
Orthologs
Databases	NCBI: entry; OMA: entry
Species	Human	Mouse
Entrez	255349	333048
Ensembl	ENSG00000206069	ENSMUSG00000066964
UniProt	Q6ICI0	Q3UUA0
RefSeq (mRNA)	NM_001001663; NM_001388199	NM_001033428
RefSeq (protein)	NP_001001663	NP_001028600
Location (UCSC)	Chr 22: 24.94 – 24.95 Mb	Chr 5: 113.37 – 113.39 Mb
PubMed search
- Wikidata
View/Edit Human	View/Edit Mouse

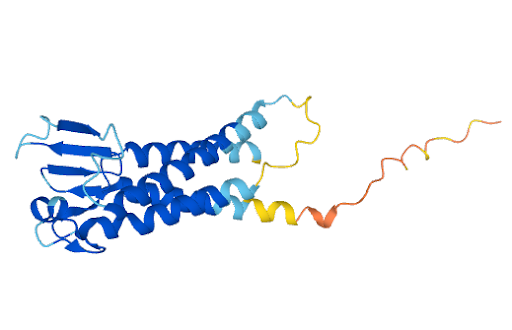
Human TMEM211

LHFPL tetraspan subfamily member 7 protein is a protein that in humans is encoded by the LHFLP7 gene (previously TMEM211). It is a tetraspan membrane protein under the LHFPL subfamily.

== Expression and localization ==
Human TMEM211 RNA is expressed in relatively low levels, but displays clear spikes in the tissues of the brain, stomach, lungs, breasts, ovaries, prostate, trachea, and salivary glands. In the fetus, TMEM211 RNA is again expressed in the brain and stomach, but is also expressed in the intestines. TMEM211 is also known to be expressed in skin, in significantly greater amounts in sun-exposed skin than in non-sun-exposed skin, and overexpressed in triple-negative breast cancer. In a compendium of healthy canine tissues, TMEM211 displayed the highest expression in the pancreas (Figure 1). Within the pancreas, TMEM211 displays highly biased abundance in the islets of Langerhans, and is absent from other pancreatic tissue(Figure 2). TMEM211 is localized to the plasma membrane as a result of its four transmembrane helices.

Despite the protein's localization to the uterus, ovaries, and breast milk, oral administration of estradiol to menopausal women does not produce a significant change in the level of TMEM211 expression. However, it did significantly reduce the variability of TMEM211 between samples, indicating that estrogen does exert a controlling effect on TMEM211, likely through an indirect mechanism (Figure 3). TMEM211 was also shown to be expressed in higher levels in obese individuals (Figure 4). This result may be explained by the finding that obesity, especially non-diabetic obesity, is correlated with an increase in both the volume and number of islets of Langerhans. Alzheimer's patients likewise displayed higher TMEM211 expression compared to non-Alzheimer's individuals, as did women when compared to men (Figure 5).

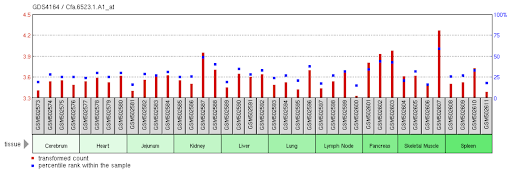
Figure 1. TMEM211 RNA Compendium of normal tissues in Canis familiaris.

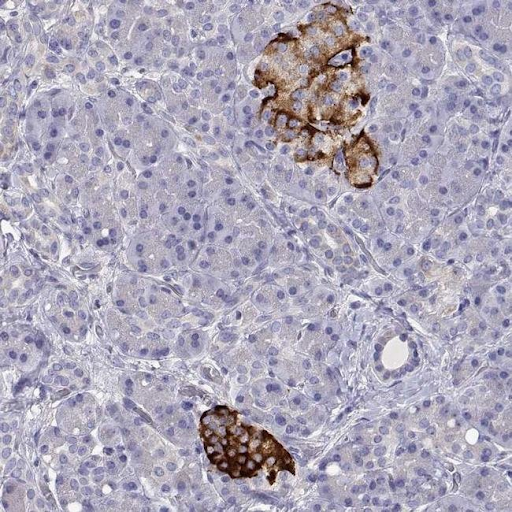
Figure 2. Immunohistochemical staining of TMEM211 in human pancreas shows strong positivity in islets of Langerhans. Samples were probed using a TMEM211 Polyclonal Antibody (Product # PA5-64290).

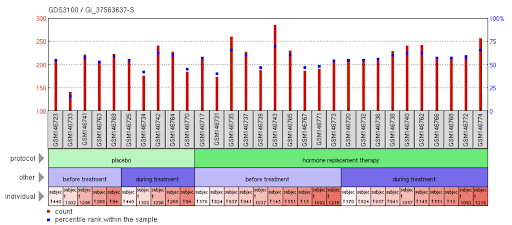
Figure 3. Oral administration of estrogen caused an increase in the expression of TMEM211, but not significantly so (p=0.24). Estrogen reduced the variability in TMEM211 expression (p<0.01).

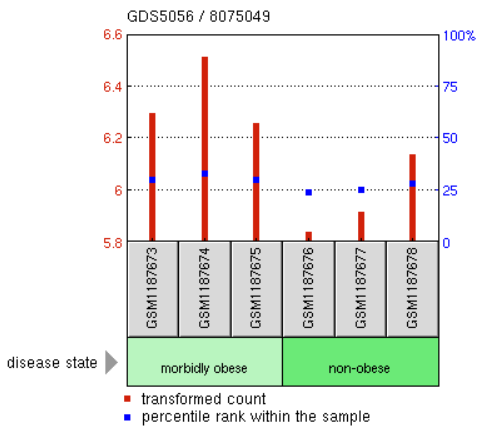
Figure 4. TMEM211 is expressed higher in those who are morbidly obese than those who are not (p=0.015).

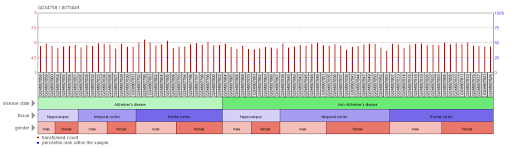
Figure 5. Alzheimer's patients express more TMEM211 than non-Alzheimer's individuals (p=0.051).

== Translations and homologs ==
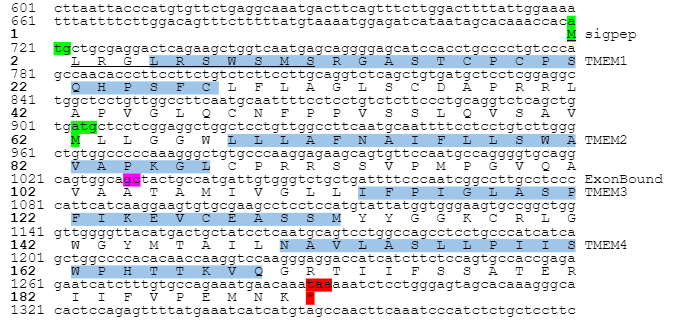
Figure 6. Annotated conceptual translation of human TMEM211. Green and red highlights indicate start and stop codons, respectively.

Figure 6 displays select regions of interest of the TMEM211 human protein sequence. Most notably, it shows the location and presence of the transmembrane regions and the exon boundary. The RNA transcript is made of four exons, but only two of these exons contain coding sequence. Uniquely, the protein has two start codons, both of which can begin translation and lead to protein products. This is the main cause of TMEM211 isoforms.

=== Ortholog space ===
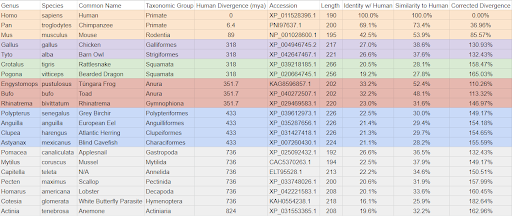
Figure 7. Ortholog Space for TMEM211.

TMEM211 is present in the majority of animal species, but does not exist outside of animals (Figure 7). The oldest group of organisms where the gene is found ubiquitously is anemones, which diverged from humans 824 million years ago. The gene is not found in organisms that diverged 934 million years ago, indicating that the gene is between 824 and 934 million years old. Following evolution, the gene is then found in fish, amphibians, reptiles, birds, and mammals. However, there is one clade with a different pattern of expression, arthropods. The gene is readily found in crustaceans, but is missing from all other arthropods. For unknown reasons, marine arthropods maintain the TMEM211 gene while terrestrial arthropods have lost it.

There is one possible exception to this, the White Butterfly Parasite. This gene is found by BLAST when searching for human TMEM211, and searching for White Butterfly Parasite's TMEM211 sequence did return results in other parasitic wasps, indicating that this was not likely a sequencing or contamination error. This small clade may have preserved the gene while the rest of the terrestrial arthropods lost it. However, the TMEM211 genes found within this clade are significantly less similar than every other organism with the same ancestral distance from humans. While the gene may be an ortholog, it also may be serving a new function for this group of wasps, which is why this clade retained the gene while other insects lost it. This would also explain the higher percent divergence. Similarly, it is possible that this group does not express the gene, which would mean that no evolutionary forces work against its mutation, allowing it to change faster than in organisms where the gene must serve as a template for a functional protein. Finally, it has been proven that the caterpillar species that this group of wasps preys upon uses an entomopathogenic defense mechanism. This virus does not cause illness to the caterpillar, but does infect the wasp eggs and wasp larvae and has been shown to cause horizontal gene transfer. It is easily plausible that the TMEM211 gene was given to this subset of wasps by one of these viruses. Then, as the gene was artificially created in the genome and does not serve a real purpose, it mutates freely, leading to the observed divergence that is higher than expected. This explanation is supported by the fact that the intron that separates the two halves of the protein is missing. Alternatively, the BLAST result might be misleading, and what is flagged as TMEM211 is actually a member of the paralogous LHFPL family, which is known to be found in both wasps and caterpillars, and includes members that do not share the TMEM211 intron.

=== Sequence alignments ===
The MSA of distant orthologs highlights several conserved regions (Figure 8). However, the human gene does not partake in the majority of this conservation, nor do the other mammals. This is consistent with the protein's presence in breastmilk; non-mammalian species do not have breastmilk, and thus the protein may have slightly different functions in mammals and non-mammals. Much of the protein's identity that is found to match appears scattered, but there is one clear region of highest conservation. In humans, this region spans amino acids 132–150. The other two regions with high conservation shared by humans span amino acids 59-71 and 110–117. There are only six amino acids with complete conservation across all species, Cys27, Gly 65, Gln100, Pro115, Cys127, Cys138. Half of the completely conserved amino acids are cysteine, thus cysteine's sulfhydryl group and ability to form disulfide bridges and covalent bonds may be important to the protein's structure and/or function.

Overall, the amino acids with the highest conservation in respect to the human sequence are tyrosine (81%) and tryptophan (72%). These two amino acids are vital to transmembrane proteins as they can interact with both the hydrophobic membrane and the aqueous environment inside or outside of the cell, and thus, it is logical that these amino acids are highly conserved. Looking at the mammals’ alignment, the majority of the protein is conserved (Figure 9). In fact, every protein that is wholly unconserved is found embedded within the membrane, where exact identity likely matters less to the function of the protein. This pattern remains true in the broader MSA of orthologs, where the regions of least conservation are mostly inside the membrane. While keeping this conservation, TMEM211 has evolved and mutated with the organisms that carry it. The divergence of each organism's gene follows normal phylogeny (Figure 10).

Figure 8. Multiple sequence alignment of TMEM211 orthologs.

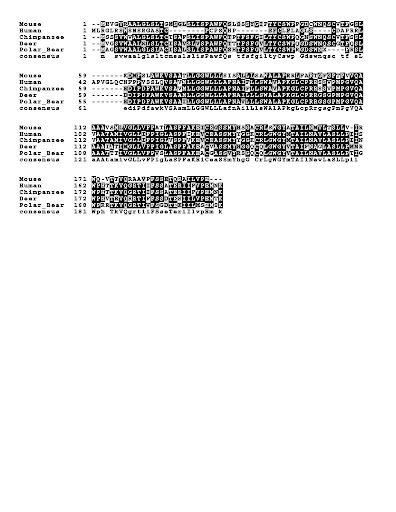
Figure 9. Multiple sequence alignment of mammalian TMEM211 protein sequences.

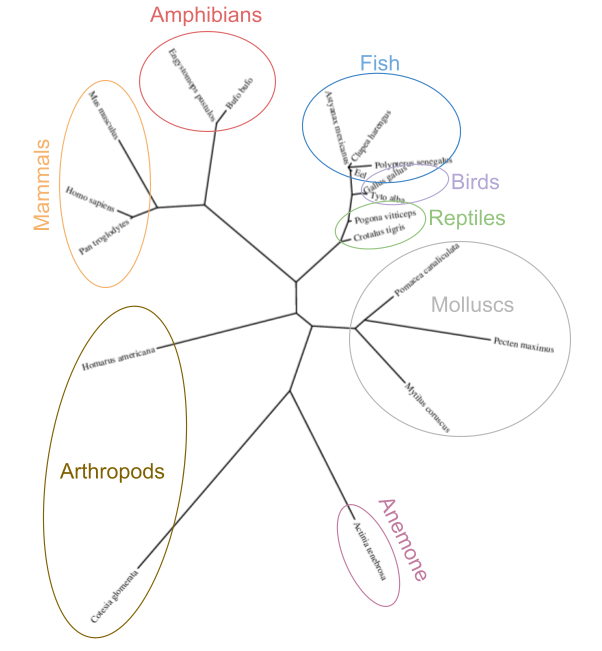
Figure 10. Unrooted phylogenetic tree based on TMEM211 orthologs.

=== Conserved regions ===
There is evidence that suggests that the transmembrane segments are conserved to a lesser degree than are the other segments of the protein, a notion supported by the frequent swapping of small, nonpolar amino acids within these regions. To test this hypothesis, Shannon Variability bits were computed for each position within the protein (Figure 11). While this correlation is indeed observed, the relationship is not great enough to be conclusive. Using the Shannon bits, Figure 12 converts the annotated conceptual translation to an annotated representation that better highlights the proximity of the conserved regions and amino acids in three-dimensional space. The first and third conserved regions are located adjacent to one another on the extracellular side of the protein, possibly creating an active site. The orientation of the transmembrane domains also brings several cysteines into close proximity, allowing them to form disulfide bridges.

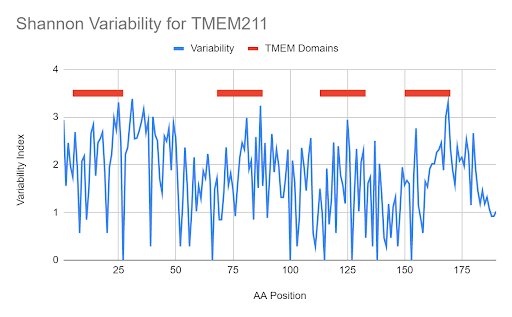
Figure 11. Shannon Variability for TMEM211 Orthologs. Transmembrane domains display a 1.80 average variability compared to a 1.70 average variability for other segments, which is not significant (p=0.19).

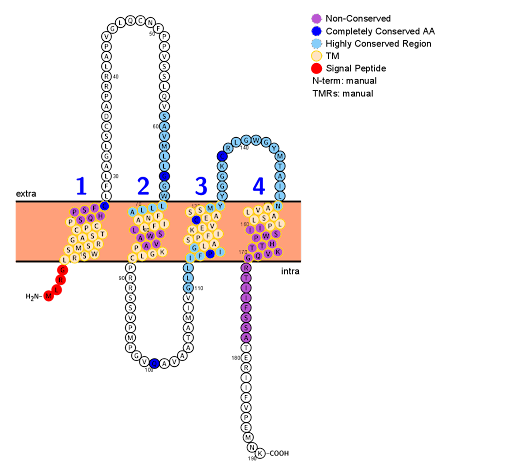
Figure 12. Representation of human TMEM211

=== Paralogs ===
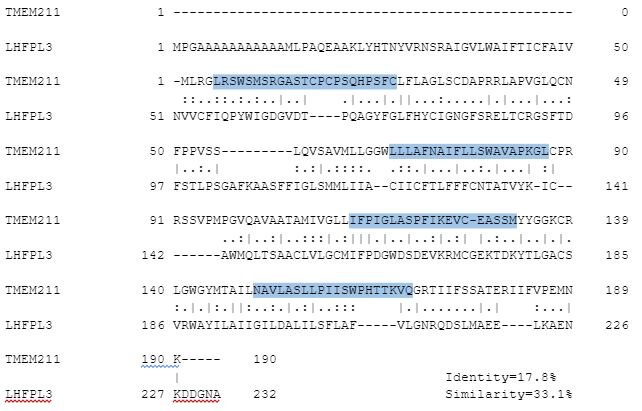
Figure 13. Global alignment of human TMEM211 and human LHFPL3 isorform 2. Transmembrane regions of TMEM211 are highlighted in blue.

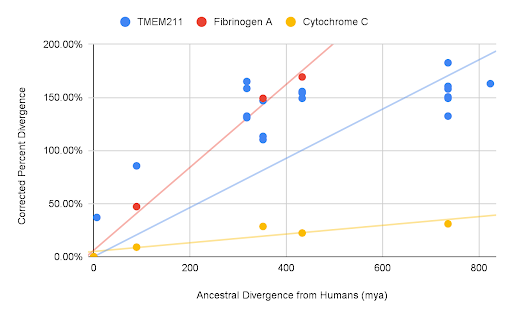
Figure 14. Corrected percent divergence vs ancestral distance from humans for TMEM211, fibrinogen alpha, and cytochrome C.

A BLAST query of the human TMEM211 sequence within the human genome returns no results. This would seem to indicate that humans have no paralog. However, submitting non-mammalian TMEM211 sequences as queries returns Homo sapiens Lipoma high-mobility group I C protein fusion partner-like tetraspan subfamily member 3 protein isoform 2 (LHFPL3). Additionally, BLAST queries of non-mammalian TMEM211 sequences searching within those organisms’ genomes return numerous results within the LHFPL family. This protein is similar to TMEM211 in the fact that it is a tetraspan membrane protein. To evaluate whether these four transmembrane regions are the cause for high similarity, a global alignment between human TMEM211 and human LHFPL3 was created (Figure 13). The similarity does not appear confined to the transmembrane regions, indicating that these two proteins may be paralogous. Additionally, 4 of the 6 amino acids completely conserved in TMEM211 orthologs are aligned between TMEM211 and LHFPL3, furthering the evidence that these proteins are paralogs (p<.01).

The LHFPL family is of known function; members of the family aid protein binding in the brain and are vital to the perception of sound. Knockouts or loss of function mutations to these family members cause complete or partial deafness in humans and mice that is then inherited in an autosomal recessive pattern. Other mutations to LHFPL have been linked to tumors, autism, Alzheimer's, and other neurological conditions. The conserved cysteine residues in TMEM211 indicate that this could be a possible function for TMEM211 as well. The conserved regions that align in three-dimensional space may form a binding site that uses the conserved cysteine residues to recognize and bind substrates. Similar to TMEM211, the LHFPL family members show biased expression in the brain and salivary glands. LHFPL was not shown to be expressed in the pancreas, but per the aforementioned discussion, exclusion of the islets of Langerhans from pancreatic samples would lead to this result. LHFPL RNA, like TMEM211, was present in lower levels in the GI tract, kidneys, prostate, thyroid, and sex organs. LHFPL family members have been studied more so than TMEM211, and protein abundance data shows that each family member, with the exception of LHFPL2, displays its highest abundance level in healthy tissues in the brain. While still found in brain tissue at higher concentrations than the majority of other brain proteins, LHFPL2 displays an abundance in platelets that is 60 times greater, in the top 10% of platelet proteins. Each family member also displayed heightened abundance in lung cancer cell lines, as did TMEM211. Several LHFPL family members were also found in breastmilk, but in greatly lower quantities than TMEM211. Despite the association with hearing and sound perception, neither TMEM211 or any LHFPL family members show a pattern of localization biased to the thalamus, temporal lobe, or auditory cortex.

Fibrinogen alpha is understood to be a rapidly evolving protein, while cytochrome C is a model of a slowly evolving protein. The linear trendline for the corrected divergence of TMEM211 is closer to that of fibrinogen alpha chain than that of cytochrome C (Figure 14). Looking at the data itself, TMEM211 and fibrinogen alpha chain have diverged at almost exactly the same rate over the last 400 million years. Thus, TMEM211 is a rapidly changing protein as well. This may be due to patterns observed earlier, where the segments of the protein inside the membrane are allowed to change with great liberty. It is also possible that the divergence accelerated with the rise of the first mammal 200 million years ago, assuming that the protein's existence in breastmilk is indicative of different function. Finally, the human LHFPL3 gene shares 17.8% identity with human TMEM211, which corresponds to a corrected divergence of 173%. This divergence aligns with that of the anemones, the most distant human ancestor to share the TMEM211 gene, something that would be expected if the two genes are paralogs born from the same ancestral gene. Using the trendline to predict LHFPL's date of divergence results in an estimation of 634-903 mya (95% confidence interval). This overlaps the estimated range of the emergence of the TMEM211 gene 824-934 million years ago, supporting the notion that the two are paralogs.

== Transcription ==
=== Promoter ===
Figure 15. TMEM211 is under the GXP_6044388 promoter.

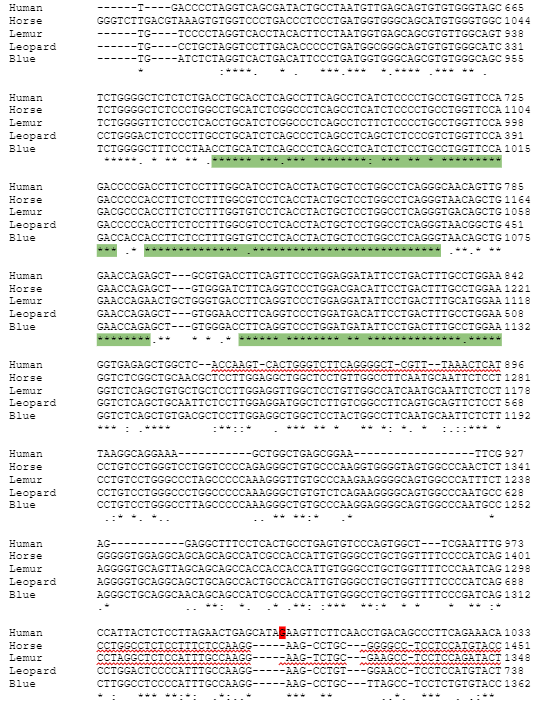
Figure 16. MSA of Human GXP_6044388 Section and Orthologs. Red highlight indicates the start of human transcription. Green highlights display regions of high conservation.

TMEM211 is understood to be under the control of the GXP_6044388 promoter (Figure 15). The GXP_6044388 promoter is widely found across species, and maintains distinct regions of conservation (Figure 16). In humans, there is a 40 base pair overlap between this promoter and the first exon of the TMEM211 RNA transcript, though this exon does not directly contribute to the resulting protein sequence. The promoter does not appear near enough to other genes to influence the expression of anything other than TMEM211. Orthologs for this promoter sequence are found before TMEM211 orthologs in a multitude of species. There are sequences with high shared identity with the GXP_6044388 promoter sequence found on chromosomes 5,6,7,13,14,15,16,17,18,19,20, and Y, though many of these sequences are not located near other genes and may not be expressed. Interestingly, the GXP_6044388 shares an average 43.83% identity with the LHFPL family members’ 6 promoters. This shared identity is high enough to conclude that these promoters are homologous.

=== Transcription factors ===
FEZF1.02 and VDR_RXR.03 are the most likely candidates to control TMEM211 gene expression. FEZF1.02 was selected as a likely candidate because it was the only identified possible transcription factor to be specific to the brain, where TMEM211 is known to be expressed in high quantities relative to other sites of expression. FEZF1.02 increases transcription, and binds opposite the VDR_RXR.03, a heterodimer transcriptional coactivator that is dependent on calcitriol. Calcitriol is a form of vitamin D that is partly produced in skin in response to sunlight, which would explain TMEM211's higher expression in sun-exposed skin than in non-sun-exposed skin. Additionally, the main site of calcitriol production is the kidney, to be used as a hormone that signals the thyroid gland, and both of these locations were amongst the highest areas of TMEM211 expression. Calcitriol is also passed from nursing mothers in breastmilk. Furthermore, oral administration of estrogen has been shown to increase the bioavailability of consumed calcitriol, and leads to higher levels of calcitriol in circulation. Thus, the VDR_RXR.03 can explain the effects of oral estrogen administration on TMEM211 expression. Calcitriol is also a molecule relied on by the lungs for proper function. Finally, TMEM211 displayed an extreme pattern of localization to the islets of Langerhans in pancreatic tissue. Pancreatic beta cells are known to partake in calcitriol signaling, responding with an increase in insulin secretion from the islets of Langerhans and an increased resistance to cellular stresses. Overall, VDR_RXR.03 can single-handedly explain the majority of TMEM211 expression and localization. It is also of interest that calcitriol treatment has been shown to increase the expression of LHFPL RNA.

== mRNA ==
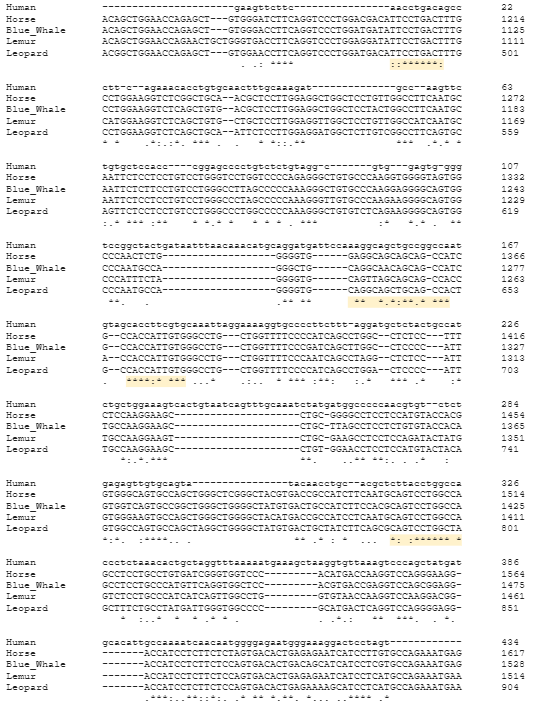
Figure 17. Alignment of TMEM211 5’UTR. Yellow highlights areas of conservation.

The 5’UTR of TMEM211 is conserved to a lesser degree than is the coding sequence (Figure 17). The 3’UTR is not conserved at all, to the point that BLAST cannot locate other orthologous sequences. This may be because the 3’UTR is not thermodynamically favorable, and has many possible conformations within each species. Thus, the only structural elements of note are present in the 5’UTR. There is a stable, highly conserved stem-loop present in the mRNA that is located near the start of translation that may sterically hinder translation, or, conversely, be recognized by initiation factors or transport proteins (Figure 18, left). There is one structural element that is conserved across orthologs in both sequence and structure, a pair of adjacent, highly stable stem-loops (Figure 18, middle). This structure is located far from other sites along the linear sequence, but may be recognized by transport proteins or signaling pathways. Finally, there is a less stable stem-loop present at the 5’ end of the 5’UTR (Figure 18, right). While this stem-loop is less stable than the other structural elements, the sequence and structure of the loop itself is completely conserved across the orthologs, including the cytosine that is bumped out from the stem. This suggests that this structure is recognized and bound by some protein, where then the low level of base-pairing along the stem would allow the structure to be easily undone and allow the mRNA to remain bound to the protein. In fact, the conserved and exposed loop are recognized as a binding site by MEIS1.01, a homeobox protein involved in neural crest development and neural differentiation. Moreover, MEIS1 deficiency causes hearing loss in mice, which is also the result observed when LHFPL paralogs lose function.

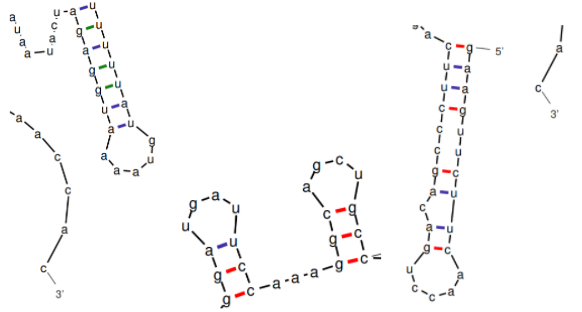
Figure 18. Select TMEM211 mRNA structural elements predicted by mfold. Structures were chosen based on favorable thermodynamic properties and conservation across orthologs. The 3’ end is where translation begins.

== Structure ==
=== Internal repeats ===
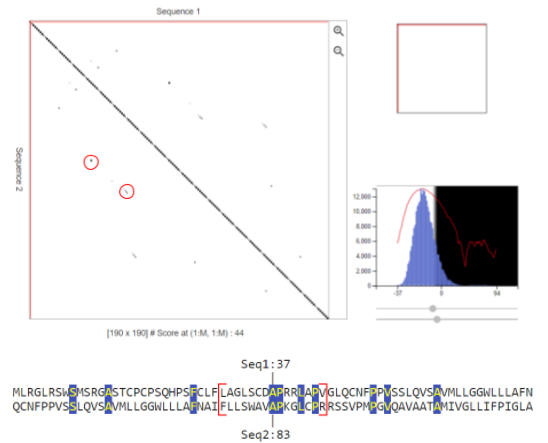
Figure 19. Dot Matrix of human TMEM211. Red circles highlight the only internal repeats with positive scores. The highest scoring local alignment is found between the 37th and 83rd positions in the protein, which received a score of 6. Created using Dotlet.

There are only two local alignments within TMEM211 that produce positive scores (Figure 19). Neither of these alignments are impressively similar, and are likely the result of random chance. This dismissal is supported by the fact that neither of these repeats are conserved across other animals.

=== Composition ===
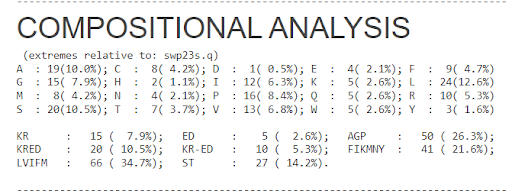
Figure 20. Compositional analysis of human TMEM211. There are no significant deviations from average human protein composition.

Human TMEM211 has a molecular weight of 20.4 KD and an isoelectric point of 9.64. This MW is smaller than the average human protein, while the pI is far higher than the average pI of human proteins (6.5), but still within the normal range for a transmembrane protein. There are no clusters of charge despite this elevated pI. The protein sequence does not significantly deviate from average human proteins in its amino acid composition (Figure 20).

The human TMEM211 protein sequence has been analyzed by a number of software to look for structural elements, domains, and localization information. The presence of the four transmembrane domains were confirmed by PSORT II, Eukaryotic Linear Motif, and Interpro. These software also confirmed the orientation of the protein within the membrane and its localization. Additionally, PSORT II and PROSITE identified a leucine zipper pattern starting at position 56. Most notably, MyHits Motif Scan identified a domain shared with the LHFPL family spanning positions 100–157. Similarly, MotifFinder also reported a domain shared between TMEM211 and the LHFPL family, though it expanded this shared region to span positions 53–158. This expansion now includes the previously identified leucine zipper pattern.

=== Post-translational modifications ===
The human TMEM211 protein sequence has been analyzed with multiple software to search for sites of post-translational modification. First, the Eukaryotic Linear Motif tool identified several statistically significant phosphorylation sites and a glycosaminoglycan attachment site, but all were contained within transmembrane domains where the amino acid sequence would not be exposed to these factors. Furthermore, these locations are not conserved across orthologs, not even in other mammals. Negative results were similarly obtained from Marcoil, Sulfinator, PhosphoSitePlus, GPS-SUMO, NetNGlyc, and NetOGlyc.

NetPhos predicts very strongly that S93 would be phosphorylated, but this serine does not exist in orthologs outside of primates. However, it is possible that this is part of a mammal-specific function. This serine is on the opposite side of the membrane from the hypothesized active site, so it is unlikely that it modulates protein activity. This phosphorylation site could be part of a signal pathway that the protein conducts.

DiANNA also finds results, highlighting the probable formation of a disulfide bond between C127 and C138. Other results that involved a bond across the cell membrane were dismissed. The cysteines in the predicted bond are conserved completely across all organisms in the MSA, and thus, this bond is likely of vital importance to TMEM211's structure and resulting function.

=== Annotated structure ===
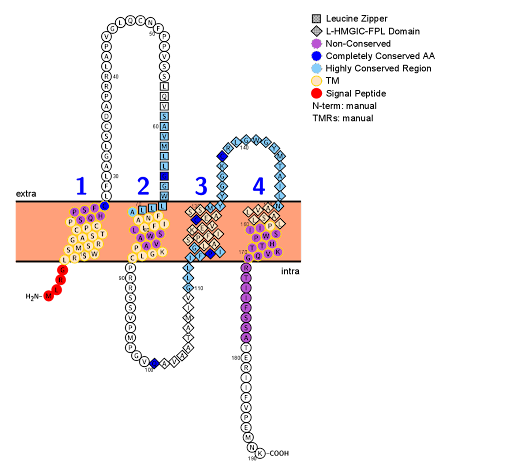
Figure 21. Representation of human TMEM211 annotated with domains of interest and conservation.

Identified domains of interest were added to the previous model of human TMEM211 (Figure 21). The leucine zipper pattern occurs over a highly conserved portion of the protein, both of which are included in the expanded domain shared with the LHFPL family. This expanded domain covers the entirety of the predicted active site, all of which is also highly conserved across species. The shorter shared domain is displayed for clarity, but even this shorter domain overlaps the majority of the active site and is highly conserved. While leucine zippers are better understood in regards to intracellular functions, extracellular leucine zippers have been shown to assist protein binding and be functional components of signal receptors. These are both identified functions of the LHFPL family and could be functions for TMEM211.

The transmembrane domains are each held in place by the protein's sequence, modifications, or secondary structures, in addition to their composition of mostly hydrophobic residues. The first transmembrane domain is held in place on the intracellular side by positively charged arginine residues that prevent the domain from slipping into the membrane. Transmembrane domains 1 and 2 are both stabilized on the extracellular side by the formation of beta sheets in the sequence between them. This structure would not be able to pass through the membrane. On the intracellular side, transmembrane domain 2 is prevented from moving by charged arginine residues and polar serine residues. These residues are also the predicted phosphorylation site, which would further inhibit movement of the transmembrane domain. Transmembrane domain 3 likely can shift further towards the extracellular space, as the seven amino acid sequence that precedes it is entirely hydrophobic. Shortly after, a threonine residue and a completely conserved glutamine residue would prevent the sequence from moving further into the membrane. Seven positions is also what is required for the completely conserved C127 on the other side of transmembrane domain 3 to move out of the membrane and form the predicted disulfide bond with c138. Once formed, this bond would prevent the domain from slipping back into its original position. Transmembrane domain 4 can likely shift more freely, as no matter its position, it will force some quantity of charged or polar residues into the membrane. It may be able to slide all the way until it encounters the disulfide bond of c138, for this positioning forces the least number of polar and charged amino acids into the membrane. This region of polar and charged residues inside a hydrophobic membrane is one of the least conserved areas of the protein, likely because it is unstable and away from the active site.

=== Tertiary structure ===
The structure of TMEM211 can be predicted with very high confidence (Figure 22). The only region with low confidence is the region preceding the C-terminus, which is highly non-conserved and unstable. This is also the only major portion of the protein's structure that varies across different species. As displayed, the four transmembrane domains cluster together, but space-filling models clearly show that they do not form a passable channel.

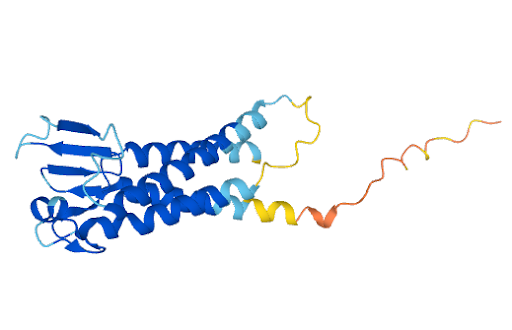
Figure 22. Human TMEM211. Confidences ranges from very high (blue, >90%) to very low (orange, <70%)

Although no clusters of charge were detected in the linear TMEM211 sequence, there is a clear cluster of charge, positive and negative, located inside the binding site (Figure 23). This would allow the TMEM211 active site to ionically interact with its ligand, as well grant the protein further substrate specificity than structure alone. Importantly, the predicted binding site of TMEM211 is solvent accessible, more so than the rest of the protein (Figure 23). This accessibility will allow the ligand to enter and interact with the protein. The combination of charges, structure, and conserved cysteine residues likely all assist TMEM211 to bind to a ligand. The binding sites of LHFPL family members bind other proteins, but no functional protein-protein interactions have been discovered for TMEM211. The only interaction that has been observed is between TMEM211 and P29996 of Hepatitis Delta. However, P29996 is known to interact with 156 other human proteins of various types, and TMEM211 is likely caught up in this promiscuity and not targeted for any specific functional role.

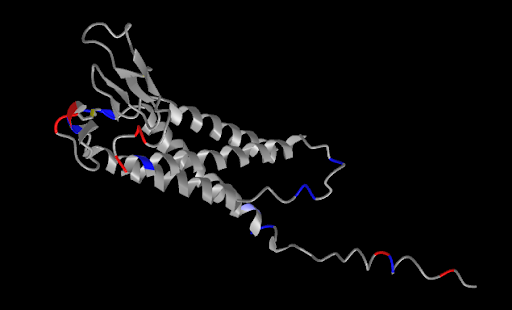
Figure 23. Human TMEM211 with charged residues. Positive charges are colored blue while negative charges are colored red.

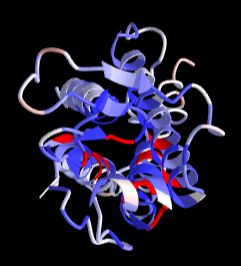
Figure 24. Extracellular view looking into the active site of TMEM211. Residues are colored based on the percentage of solvent accessible surface area, blue coloration indicates less than 45% accessibility, while red indicates greater than 45% accessibility. The binding pocket of the protein is the most solvent accessible region.

== Variation ==
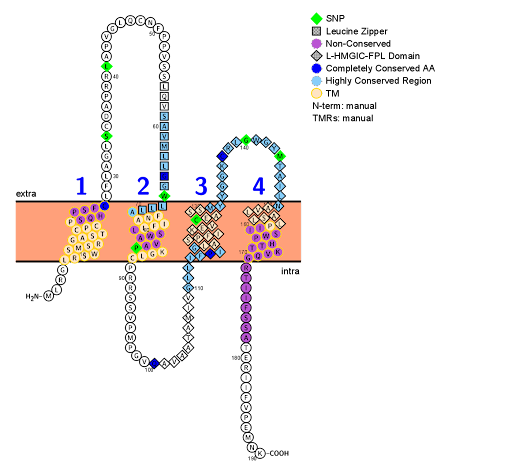
Figure 25. Human TMEM211 representation annotated with domains of interest, conserved regions, and known SNPs.

Excluding silent mutations, there are 7 SNPs known to occur with heterozygosity in the human population of TMEM211 genes. These mutations were added to the representation of TMEM211 (Figure 25). Mutation W67R, presents with 50% heterozygosity, indicating that this mutation likely has little or no effect on protein function. However, several other variations have significant correlations with phenotypes. Variations to G140, which becomes R or A, are associated with patterns in BMI. If these changes affect the protein's function, which is known to exist in the islets of Langerhans, it could exert influence on BMI through changes to levels of secreted insulin. Variation M145I is associated with an increased risk for Alzheimers, which aligns with known variations to LHFPL that also increase Alzheimer's risk. Most notably, variation C127W is associated with deafness and hearing loss. C127 is located in the binding pocket and is predicted to form a disulfide bond with C138. Tryptophan would not be able to engage in a disulfide bond and would likely alter the functional capabilities of the binding site. C127W is likely a loss of function mutation, which then exactly mirrors the known resulting deafness and hearing loss from loss of function mutations in LHFPL family members. Furthering the similarity, this pair of cysteines is completely conserved across the LHFPL family.

There were no mutations occurring within the binding sites of possible transcription factors or within the mRNA structural elements, but there was not enough available data to conclude that this is due to necessary preservation of these sequences.

== Function ==
Currently, there is no known function of TMEM211. An informative experiment would be a knockout experiment in mice, where the TMEM211 gene is removed or replaced using CRISPR. Assuming the protein is serving some function, the mouse will then be deficient in some aspect. Specific attention should be paid to the mouse's perception of sound, as this is the result of knockout experiments on LHFPL family members. While this experiment would likely not prove specific functions of TMEM211, it could identify regions or pathways to focus on in future experiments. This would narrow the field of possible functions suggested by the protein's abundance in pancreas, breast, brain, and sex organ tissue.

Insulin is a vital aspect of cellular glucose uptake, and is needed by most cells in the human body. It is released in response to high blood glucose levels. Antibody staining has shown that TMEM211 displays an extreme bias for localization to the insulin secreting islets of Langerhans in pancreatic tissue, and a suggested function of TMEM211 and the LHFPL family is signal relay. Thus, a possible function of TMEM211's extracellular binding site may be to bind to glucose and relay a signal that glucose is present in the bloodstream. This is the known function of an adenosine triphosphate‐sensitive K+ channel, but signal pathways are often redundant and it would be logical for the human body to have developed redundancy for a process that is vital to life. To test this hypothesis, a surface plasmon resonance experiment should be conducted using stabilized TMEM211 and glucose solution. This method of experimentation is effective at assessing binding between small ligands and membrane proteins. If the binding rate determined is non-zero, then glucose is likely binding to the active site. If the binding rate determine is zero, the experiment should be repeated with non-glucose nutrients that affect insulin secretion, namely free fatty acids and free amino acids, and repeated with hormones that affect insulin secretion, including melatonin, estrogen, leptin, growth hormone, and glucagon like peptide-1. If any of these result in a non-zero binding rate, an experiment can then be conducted to determine if that interaction is responsible for signaling insulin release. It is also possible that, unlike the glucose pathway, the binding of TMEM211 and resulting signal suppress insulin release. The results of this experiment can then be applied elsewhere. Many other cells and tissues with TMEM211 also respond to glucose or hormones, and while the signal may cause a different response in each cell type, the extracellular binding site should maintain its specificity for its ligand no matter the tissue type. For instance, the salivary gland produces extra saliva in the presence of glucose and has high expression of TMEM211. If results from pancreatic experiments show that TMEM211 is detecting and signaling glucose levels, it could be hypothesized that TMEM211 is modulating saliva production in the salivary gland.

Finally, neither TMEM211 nor any LHFPL family member showed biased abundance for the parts of the brain associated with auditory processing, yet mutations affect an organism's ability to hear. However, the 5’UTR of TMEM211 mRNA is highly conserved and is bound by MEIS1.01, an embryonic protein involved in neural differentiation. It is possible that mutations to these genes do not cause deafness or loss of hearing by breaking the pathway for the perception of sound, but by preventing the appropriate development of structures needed to process auditory signals. The mutations could prevent some aspect of the auditory pathway from assembling or differentiating correctly during development. This is the mechanism by which mutation to other inner ear transmembrane proteins causes deafness. These mutations could be induced in mice, allowing for the examination of differences to structure and sound processing between mice who have TMEM211 mutations, mice with LHFPL mutations, and control mice. fMRI would allow researchers to observe where in the auditory processing pathway the defect was occurring. To separate these mechanisms, the experimental mice should be bred with wild type mice to create a generation of mice that are heterozygous for the mutation. These mice would still show some aspects of auditory processing and could direct researchers to the specific breakdown in the pathway that is caused by the mutation. Included in this study should be the physical examination of the inner ear.

Function in the hearing pathway also explains the patterns observed in which organisms possess the gene. Cnidaria were the first animals able to detect vibrations in the fluid surrounding their bodies. Anemone even use hair-like structures that resemble the human inner ear, a structure that likely gave rise to modern ears. Vertebrates and arthropods are the only animals to have what would be labeled as ears, but many invertebrates still use structures similar to that of the anemone. This explains the point on the divergence graph where the gene begins to rapidly change, which exactly aligns with the rise of terrestrial animals. The gene began to change faster as organisms began adapting to sound perception in air as opposed to in water. This also explains why the amphibians display much lower identity with human TMEM211 than is expected based on their date of divergence; their protein did not need to change as much as they remained in aquatic environments. Terrestrial arthropods do not possess TMEM211, even though they have ears. However, terrestrial vertebrates and terrestrial arthropods do not share a terrestrial ancestor. Vertebrates evolved to inhabit land as tetrapods, who adapted the TMEM211 gene to allow them to process sound in air. Terrestrial arthropods arose from the marine arthropods, and although they developed something labeled as an ear, it is the product of convergent evolution, not shared ancestry. The arthropods’ evolution of ears could have stopped using the TMEM211 gene as they found an alternate pathway to perceive sound in air.
