= Transmembrane protein 150A =

Protein found in humans

TMEM150A

Identifiers
- Aliases: TMEM150A, TM6P1, TMEM150, transmembrane protein 150A, TTN1
- External IDs: OMIM: 616757; MGI: 2385244; GeneCards: TMEM150A

Gene location (Human)
Chr.	Chromosome 2 (human)
Band	2p11.2	Start	85,598,547 bp
Band	2p11.2	End	85,603,196 bp

Gene location (Mouse)
Chr.	Chromosome 6 (mouse)
Band	6|6 C1	Start	72,332,430 bp
Band	6|6 C1	End	72,336,745 bp
RNA expression pattern
Bgee	Human / Mouse (ortholog); Top expressed in: body of pancreas; gastrocnemius muscle; right lobe of liver; muscle of thigh; right testis; left testis; upper lobe of left lung; body of stomach; gastric mucosa; anterior pituitary / Top expressed in: yolk sac; renal cortex; proximal tubule; placenta; right kidney; human kidney; liver; secondary oocyte; skeletal muscle tissue; muscle of thigh; More reference expression data
BioGPS	n/a
Gene ontology
Molecular function	protein binding
Cellular component	integral component of membrane; plasma membrane; lysosome; integral component of plasma membrane; membrane
Biological process	phosphatidylinositol phosphate biosynthetic process; catabolic process; protein localization to plasma membrane; regulation of autophagy
Sources:Amigo / QuickGO
Orthologs
Databases	NCBI: entry; OMA: entry
Species	Human	Mouse
Entrez	129303	232086
Ensembl	ENSG00000168890	ENSMUSG00000055912
UniProt	Q86TG1	Q91WN2
RefSeq (mRNA)	NM_001031738; NM_153342; NM_001369917	NM_144916
RefSeq (protein)	NP_001026908; NP_699173; NP_001356846	NP_659165
Location (UCSC)	Chr 2: 85.6 – 85.6 Mb	Chr 6: 72.33 – 72.34 Mb
PubMed search
- Wikidata
View/Edit Human	View/Edit Mouse

Transmembrane protein 150A is a protein that, in humans, is encoded by the TMEM150A gene (previously TMEM150). This protein regulates phosphatidylinositol 4-phosphate synthesis.
