= FHIT =

Protein-coding gene in the species Homo sapiens

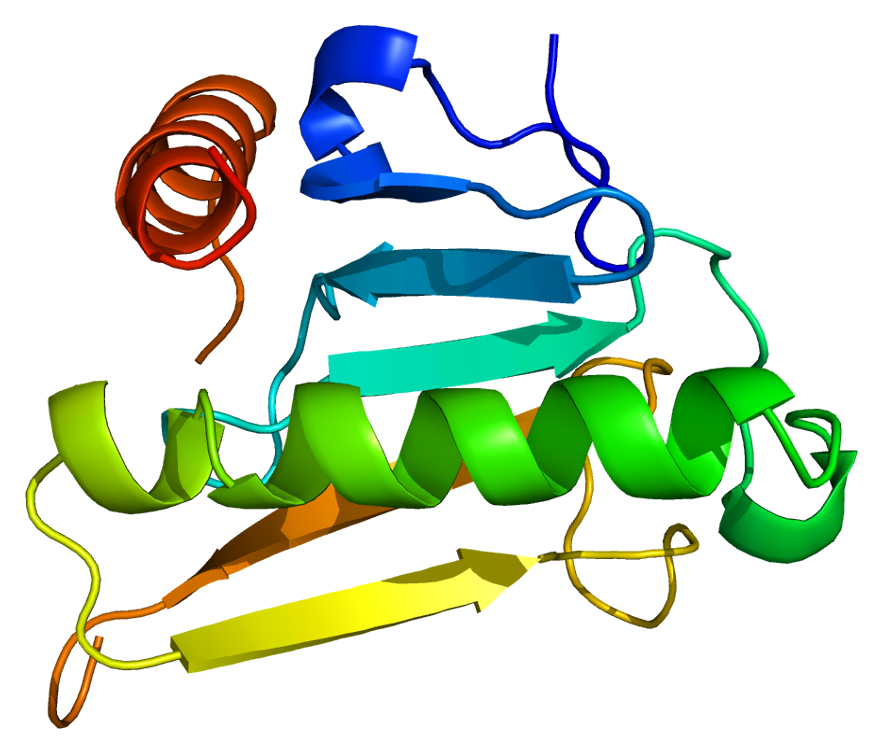

Identifiers
- Aliases: FHIT, AP3Aase, FRA3B, fragile histidine triad, tríada histidina fràgil, fragile histidine triad diadenosine triphosphatase
- External IDs: OMIM: 601153; MGI: 1277947; GeneCards: FHIT
Available structures
PDB	Ortholog search: PDBe RCSB
PDB	List of PDB id codes 1FHI, 2FHI, 2FIT, 5FIT, 3FIT, 1FIT, 4FIT, 6FIT
Enzyme activity
EC #	BRENDA	ExPASy	KEGG	MetaCyc
2.7.7.51	↗	↗	↗	↗
3.6.1.29	↗	↗	↗	↗
3.6.2.1	↗	↗	↗	↗

Gene location (Human)
Chr.	Chromosome 3 (human)
Band	3p14.2	Start	59,747,277 bp
Band	3p14.2	End	61,251,459 bp

Gene location (Mouse)
Chr.	Chromosome 14 (mouse)
Band	14 A1|14 5.61 cM	Start	11,307,738 bp
Band	14 A1|14 5.61 cM	End	12,919,681 bp
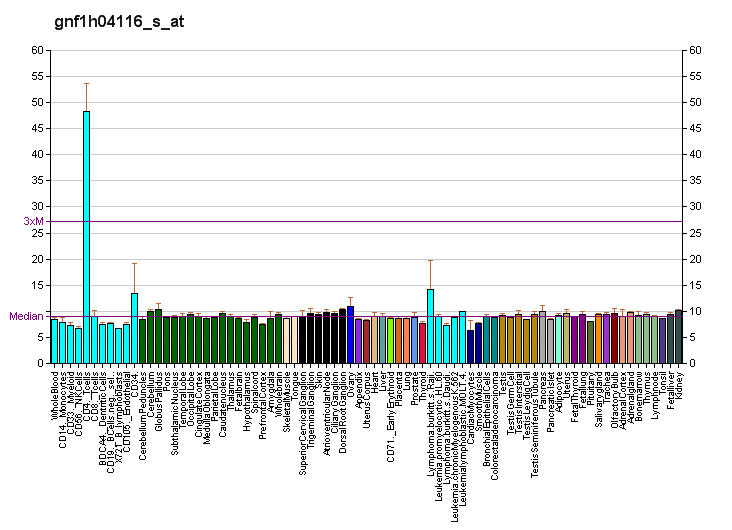
RNA expression pattern
Bgee	Human / Mouse (ortholog); Top expressed in: right adrenal gland; right adrenal cortex; left adrenal cortex; apex of heart; C1 segment; gallbladder; oocyte; right auricle of heart; testicle; human kidney / Top expressed in: right kidney; lumbar spinal ganglion; transitional epithelium of urinary bladder; Epithelium of choroid plexus; motor neuron; saccule; proximal tubule; choroid plexus of fourth ventricle; seminal vesicula; morula; More reference expression data
BioGPS	More reference expression data
Gene ontology
Molecular function	bis(5'-adenosyl)-triphosphatase activity; nucleotide binding; catalytic activity; hydrolase activity; protein binding; ubiquitin protein ligase binding; identical protein binding
Cellular component	cytoplasm; cytosol; mitochondrion; nucleus; fibrillar center; plasma membrane
Biological process	negative regulation of proteasomal ubiquitin-dependent protein catabolic process; purine nucleotide metabolic process; regulation of transcription, DNA-templated; nucleotide metabolic process; transcription, DNA-templated; intrinsic apoptotic signaling pathway by p53 class mediator; apoptotic process
Sources:Amigo / QuickGO
Orthologs
Databases	NCBI: entry; OMA: entry
Species	Human	Mouse
Entrez	2272	14198
Ensembl	ENSG00000189283	ENSMUSG00000060579
UniProt	P49789	O89106
RefSeq (mRNA)	NM_001166243; NM_002012; NM_001320899; NM_001320900; NM_001320901 NM_001354589; NM_001354590	NM_010210; NM_001308285; NM_001308286; NM_001360141
RefSeq (protein)	NP_001159715; NP_001307828; NP_001307829; NP_001307830; NP_002003 NP_001341518; NP_001341519	NP_001295214; NP_001295215; NP_034340; NP_001347070
Location (UCSC)	Chr 3: 59.75 – 61.25 Mb	Chr 14: 11.31 – 12.92 Mb
PubMed search
- Wikidata
View/Edit Human	View/Edit Mouse

Bis(5'-adenosyl)-triphosphatase also known as fragile histidine triad protein (FHIT) is an enzyme that in humans is encoded by the FHIT gene.

== Function ==
FHIT is also known as human accelerated region 10. It may, therefore, have played a key role in differentiating humans from apes.

This gene, a member of the histidine triad gene family, encodes a diadenosine P1,P3-bis(5'-adenosyl)-triphosphate adenylohydrolase involved in purine metabolism. The gene encompasses the common fragile site FRA3B on chromosome 3, where carcinogen-induced damage can lead to translocations and aberrant transcripts of this gene. In fact, aberrant transcripts from this gene have been found in about half of all esophageal, stomach, and colon carcinomas.

Though the exact molecular function of FHIT is still partially unclear, the gene works as a tumor suppressor as it has been demonstrated in animal studies. Furthermore FHIT has been shown to synergize with VHL, another tumor suppressor, in protecting against chemically - induced lung cancer.

FHIT also acts as a tumor suppressor of HER2/neu driven breast cancer.

== Interactions ==
FHIT has been shown to interact with UBE2I.
