= WWOX =

Protein-coding gene in the species Homo sapiens

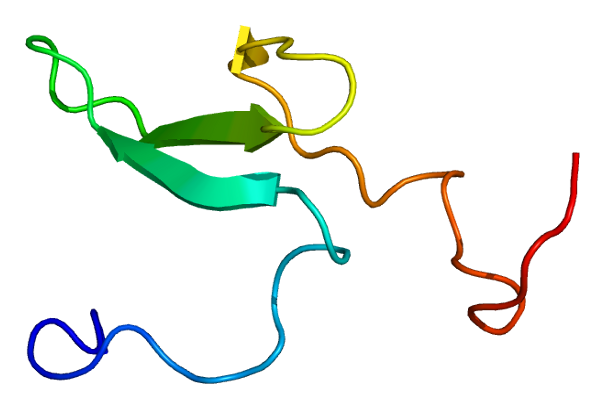

Identifiers
- Aliases: WWOX, D16S432E, FOR, FRA16D, HHCMA56, PRO0128, SCAR12, SDR41C1, WOX1, EIEE28, WW domain containing oxidoreductase, DEE28
- External IDs: OMIM: 605131; MGI: 1931237; GeneCards: WWOX
Available structures
PDB	Ortholog search: PDBe RCSB
PDB	List of PDB id codes 1WMV

Gene location (Human)
Chr.	Chromosome 16 (human)
Band	16q23.1-q23.2	Start	78,099,400 bp
Band	16q23.1-q23.2	End	79,212,667 bp

Gene location (Mouse)
Chr.	Chromosome 8 (mouse)
Band	8|8 E1	Start	115,166,395 bp
Band	8|8 E1	End	116,079,447 bp
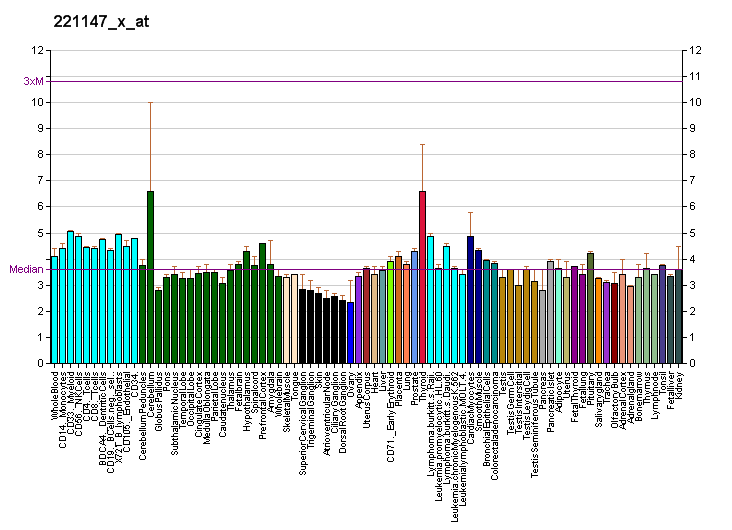
RNA expression pattern
Bgee	Human / Mouse (ortholog); Top expressed in: parotid gland; optic nerve; glomerulus; sural nerve; metanephric glomerulus; Epithelium of choroid plexus; pars reticulata; endothelial cell; kidney tubule; pars compacta / Top expressed in: interventricular septum; neural layer of retina; zygote; amygdala; visual cortex; cerebellar cortex; secondary oocyte; primary visual cortex; spermatocyte; lens; More reference expression data
BioGPS	More reference expression data
Gene ontology
Molecular function	transcription coactivator activity; protein dimerization activity; protein binding; enzyme binding; oxidoreductase activity
Cellular component	cytoplasm; cytosol; Golgi apparatus; plasma membrane; microvillus; RNA polymerase II transcription regulator complex; mitochondrion; nucleus
Biological process	cellular response to transforming growth factor beta stimulus; steroid metabolic process; extrinsic apoptotic signaling pathway; negative regulation of Wnt signaling pathway; skeletal system morphogenesis; Wnt signaling pathway; positive regulation of extrinsic apoptotic signaling pathway in absence of ligand; osteoblast differentiation; intrinsic apoptotic signaling pathway by p53 class mediator; positive regulation of extrinsic apoptotic signaling pathway; positive regulation of transcription by RNA polymerase II; apoptotic process; negative regulation of transcription by RNA polymerase II; transcription by RNA polymerase II
Sources:Amigo / QuickGO
Orthologs
Databases	NCBI: entry; OMA: entry
Species	Human	Mouse
Entrez	51741	80707
Ensembl	ENSG00000186153	ENSMUSG00000004637
UniProt	Q9NZC7	Q91WL8
RefSeq (mRNA)	NM_001291997; NM_016373; NM_018560; NM_130788; NM_130790 NM_130791; NM_130792; NM_130844	NM_019573
RefSeq (protein)	NP_001278926; NP_057457; NP_570607	NP_062519
Location (UCSC)	Chr 16: 78.1 – 79.21 Mb	Chr 8: 115.17 – 116.08 Mb
PubMed search
- Wikidata
View/Edit Human	View/Edit Mouse

WW domain-containing oxidoreductase is an enzyme that in humans is encoded by the WWOX gene.

== Gene ==
Alternative splicing of this gene generates transcript variants that encode different isoforms.

== Structure ==
WW domain-containing proteins are found in all eukaryotes and play an important role in the regulation of a wide variety of cellular functions such as protein degradation, transcription, and RNA splicing. This gene encodes a protein which contains 2 WW domains and a short-chain dehydrogenase/reductase domain (SRD).

== Function ==
The highest normal expression of this gene is detected in hormonally regulated tissues such as testis, ovary, and prostate. This expression pattern and the presence of an SRD domain suggest a role for this gene in steroid metabolism. The encoded protein is more than 90% identical to the mouse protein, which is an essential mediator of tumor necrosis factor-alpha-induced apoptosis, suggesting a similar, important role in apoptosis for the human protein. In addition, there is evidence that this gene behaves as a suppressor of tumor growth.

WWOX is also known as human accelerated region 6. It may, therefore, have played a key role in differentiating humans from apes.

== Interactions ==
WWOX has been shown to interact with P53 and ACK1.

== Disorders ==
Defects in the WWOX gene are associated with a number of developmental disorders, including WOREE syndrome.
