= CCDC142 =

Gene

Coiled-coil domain-containing protein 142

Identifiers
- Aliases: CCDC142IPR026700Coiled-Coil Domain Containing 142
- External IDs: GeneCards: ; OMA:- orthologs
Orthologs
Species	Human	Mouse
Entrez	n/a	n/a
Ensembl	n/a	n/a
UniProt	n a	n/a
RefSeq (mRNA)	n/a	n/a
RefSeq (protein)	n/a	n/a
Location (UCSC)	n/a	n/a
PubMed search	n/a	n/a
- Wikidata
View/Edit Human

The coiled-coil domain containing 142 (CCDC142) is a gene which in humans encodes the CCDC142 protein. The CCDC142 gene is located on chromosome 2 (at 2p13), spans 4339 base pairs and contains 9 exons. The gene codes for the coiled-coil domain containing protein 142 (CCDC142), whose function is not yet well understood. There are two known isoforms of CCDC142. CCDC142 proteins produced from these transcripts range in size from 743 to 665 amino acids and contain signals suggesting protein movement between the cytosol and nucleus. Homologous CCDC142 genes are found in many animals including vertebrates and invertebrates but not fungus, plants, protists, archea, or bacteria. Although the function of this protein is not well understood, it contains a coiled-coil domain and a RINT1_TIP1 motif located within the coiled-coil domain.

== Locus ==
CCDC142 Gene Locus

CCDC142 is found on the – strand of chromosome 2 (2p13.1), with the genomic sequence spanning bases 74,472,832 to 74,483,230. The coding region is 8292 base pairs long, encoding for two protein isoforms 743 to 665 amino acids in length. On the telomeric side, CCDC142 is followed by the MOGS and MRPL53 genes. On the centromeric side, it is followed by the C31, LBX2, LBX2-AS1, and PCGF1 genes.

== mRNA ==
In Homo sapiens, the CCDC142 gene encodes for two alternatively spliced isoforms of the mRNA, called isoform 1 and isoform 2. Both of these isoforms have 9 exons. Isoform 1 is the longer of the two, being 4339bp long, while isoform 2 is 2253bp long. The main difference between the isoforms that isoform 2 has a shorter exon 9 and 3' UTR. Isoform 1 is the longest variant of the gene and protein and is the subject of this article.

== Conservation ==
=== Paralogs ===
CCDC142 has no paralogs in Homo sapiens.

=== Orthologs ===
Below is a table of a variety of orthologs of CCDC142 whose protein sequence identity was compared to the Homo sapiens protein amino acid sequence. CCDC142 has more than 73% amino acid similarity in mammals, but is less conserved in other vertebrates and in invertebrates.

Genus and species	Common name	Date of Divergence from Human Lineage (MYA)	% identity
Homo sapiens	Human	0	100
Pan troglodytes	Chimpanzee	6.6	96
Gorilla gorilla gorilla	Gorilla	8.9	98
Jaculus jaculus	Lesser Egyptian jerboa	90.9	73
Bos mutus	Yak	97.5	74
Eptesicus fuscus	Big brown bat	97.5	74
Python bivittatus	Burmese python	320.5	36
Gallus gallus	Chicken	320.5	35
Haliaeetus leucocephalus	Bald eagle	320.5	33
Anolis carolinensis	Carolina anole (lizard)	320.5	33
Calidris pugnax	Ruff (bird)	320.5	32
Xenopus tropicalis	Western clawed frog	355.7	33
Callorhinchus milii	Australian ghostshark	429.6	36
Lepisosteus oculatus	Spotted gar	429.6	34
Esox lucius	Northern pike	429.6	33
Danio rerio	Zebrafish	429.6	33
Lingula anatina	Tailed mussel	847	29
Crassostrea gigas	Pacific oyster	847	29
Octopus bimaculoides	California two-spot octopus	847	27
Drosophila melanogaster	Fruit fly	847	23

=== Phylogeny ===
CCDC142 is closely related in mammals, mollusks and amphibians, reptiles and birds, and in fish. The CCDC142 gene goes as far back as Drosophila melanogaster, which split from the human lineage 847 million years ago. CCDC142 has mutated at a greater rate than both Cytochrome C (a highly conserved protein) and Fibrinogen A (a rapidly mutating protein). This indicates that CCDC142 is a rapidly mutating gene with an increasing rate of mutation (that is, evolution) over time.

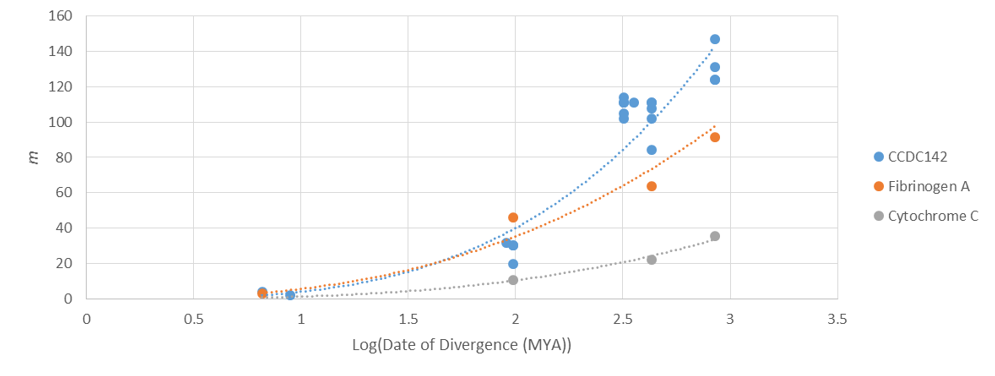
The mutation rate of CCDC142 compared to benchmark proteins, Cytochrome C and Fibrinogen A, which mutate slowly and quickly respectively. Mutation rate, m, which is the corrected percent of amino acid changes between the Homo sapiens protein and its orthologs, is plotted against the logarithm of the number of millions of years since the date of divergence of Homo sapiens lineage and the lineage of the species in which the ortholog is seen. The points on the graph are calculated according to m/100 = –ln(1–n/100), where m is the total number of amino acid changes occurred in a 100-amino-acid segment of a protein and n is the observed number of amino acid changes per 100 residues compared to the Homo sapiens protein sequence.

== Protein ==
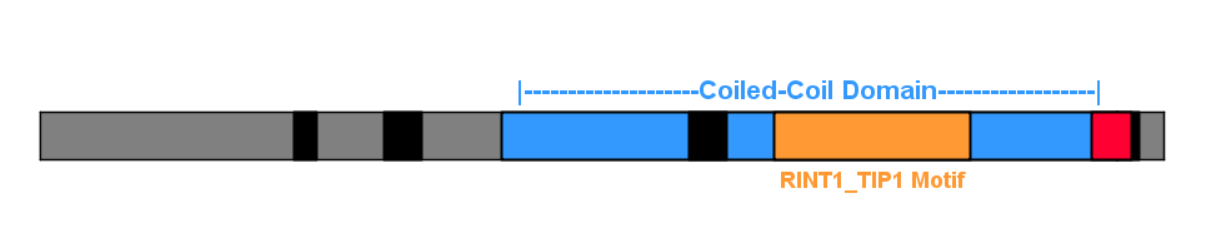
Domain Structure of the CCDC142 Protein. Highly conserved regions outside the RINT1_TIP1 motif are in black. The putative nuclear localization signal is in red.

=== Primary Structure, Variants, and Isoforms ===
The main isoform of the CCDC142 protein is 743 amino acids in length and the second isoform is 665 amino acids long. The difference in length is made entirely by amino acids missing from the C-terminus of isoform 2.

=== Domains and Motifs ===
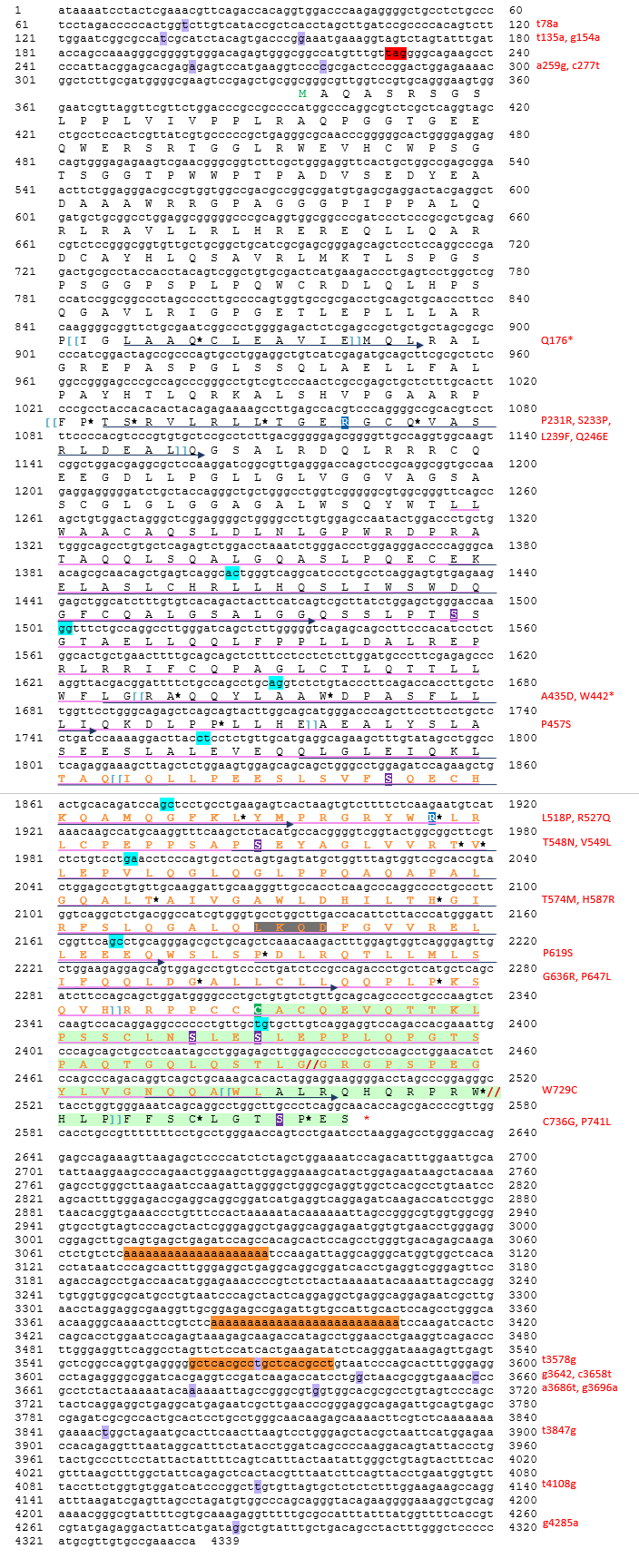
CCDC142 Conceptual Translation

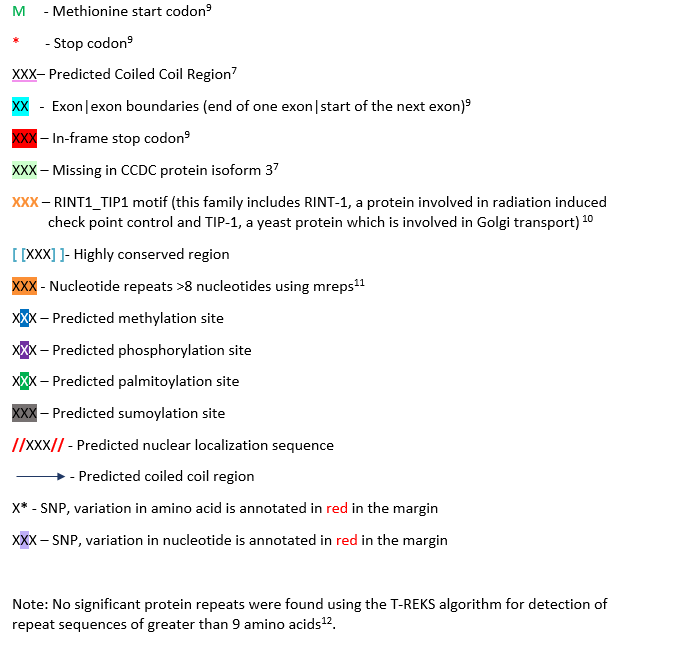
CCDC142 Conceptual Translation Legend

The predicted coiled-coil domain of CCDC142 is from amino acids 308–719. A RINT1_TIP1 motif is also present from amino acids 490–621. RINT1_TIP1 is a family that includes RINT-1 (a protein involved in radiation-induced check point control) and TIP-1 (a yeast protein which is involved in Golgi transport). The extra ~250 amino acids found in the distant ortholog CCDC142 proteins are not found in the Homo sapiens genome the near CCDC142 gene.

=== Post-Translational Modifications ===
CCDC142 is predicted to have 6 phosphorylation sites, 4 methylation sites, 1 palmitoylation site, 1 sumoylation site, and 1 weak Nuclear Localization Signal. These modifications indicate that CCDC142 is localized to the nucleus and cytosol. Refer to the Conceptual Translation for annotations of these sites in the protein.

=== Structure prediction ===
Secondary structure of CCDC142 contains only α-helices as predicted by the Quick2D and Phyre2 programs . It is predicted that CCDC142 contains eight conserved α-helices, with six located in the coiled-coil region of the protein. The predicted tertiary structure of CCDC142 contains a large coiled-coil domain from amino acids 308–719.

The I-TASSER predicted tertiary structure of CCDC142. This structure has a C-score of -.75 (measured on a scale of −5 to 2, with higher values equating higher confidence) and a cluster density of .375 (on a scale of 0 to 1, with higher values indicating greater protein prediction coverage). The C-score takes into account both significance of the model's structure and the quality of the prediction coverage from other proteins.

== Expression ==
=== Promoters and Regulatory Factors ===
The promoter region for CCDC142 was identified using the El Dorado program at Genomatix, it spans bases 74482896–74483908 in chromosome 2. This 1013bp region spans 1071–58bp upstream of the start codon of CCDC142. There is a region in the promoter which binds a large number of Krueppel-like transcription factors and BED zinc-finger proteins. This region has no single-nucleotide polymorphisms (SNPs) located in it. Many of the transcription factors that bind to the promoter region of CCDC142 have functions dealing with tumor suppression, neurogenesis, DNA damage, and photoreception. This promoter region also contains a mammalian C-type LTR TATA box which overlaps with the transcription start site of the gene.

=== RNA Binding Proteins ===
A number of possible RNA binding proteins bind to both the 3’ and 5’ untranslated regions (UTRs) of the CCDC142 mRNA. The PABPC1 and RBMX protein binding sites occur in high frequency in the 3’ UTR, with 49 and 21 sites respectively.

=== Expression ===
Allen Human Brain Atlas Expression of CCDC142

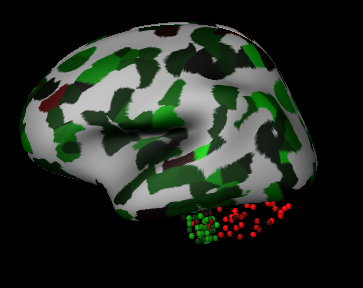
Lateral View
Red=Low Expression^{11}

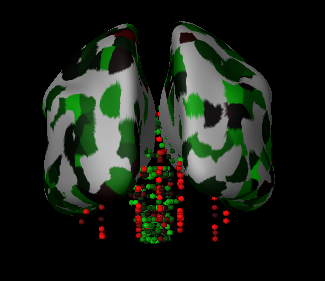
Frontal View
Green=High Expression^{11}

Above are the Allen Human Brain Atlas expression data on CCDC142, with red indicating lower expression and green indicating higher expression. In the Homo sapiens brain, it was found that CCDC142 is lowly expressed in the cerebellar cortex, thalamus and hypothalamus. CCDC142 is also highly expressed in the substantia nigra, pons, claustrum, and mesencephalon. There is also relatively higher expression of CCDC142 in the mouth and thymus.

NCBI GEO Expression Data

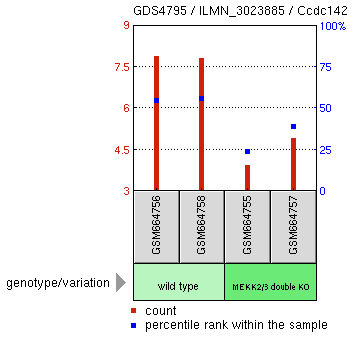
MEKK 2/3 Knockout Experiment^{13}

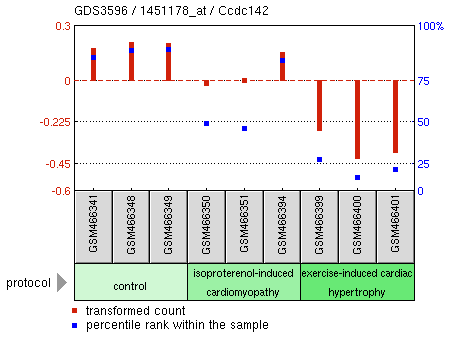
Myocardial Damage Experiment^{13}

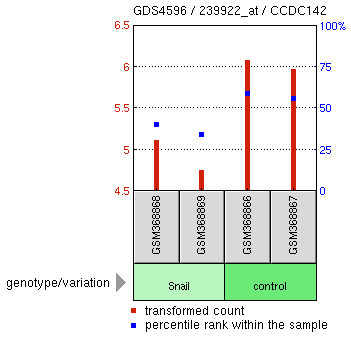
SNAI Overexpression Experiment^{13}

The above experimental expression data shows many possible findings for CCDC142. Overexpression of SNAI1, a zinc finger protein, is correlated to the reduction of CCDC142 expression in Homo sapiens. A Mus musculus knockout of MEKK 2/3, which help regulate helper T cell differentiation, also showed lowered expression of CCDC142. Another Mus musculus experiment focusing on cardiomyopathy in mice showed lower levels of CCDC142 in mice with damaged myocardial cells.

== Function and Biochemistry ==
=== Composition ===
CCDC142 has a relatively typical distribution of amino acids compared to other Homo sapiens proteins. However, some variations are noted across orthologs. Leucine is present in large amounts relative to other proteins (at over 15% of the protein) and asparagine is present in low amounts relative to other proteins (at less than 0.7% of the protein).

The coiled-coil domain and RINT1_TP1 motif of CCDC142 contain higher amounts of leucine relative to the rest of the protein (at over 16.6% of the region), higher amounts of glutamine (at over 8.4% of the region), and similarly low amounts of asparagine (at less than 0.7% of the region).

=== Interacting Proteins ===
No protein interactions have been found for CCDC142.

== Clinical Significance ==
=== Pathology and Diseases ===
Copy number gain in the CCDC142 loci, including 25 other genes, showed a phenotype of developmental delay and significant developmental or morphological phenotypes. One result with a copy number loss in the CCDC142 loci, including 29 other genes, showed phenotypes of short stature, abnormal face shape, delayed speech and language development, overlapping toe, intrauterine growth retardation, patent ductus arteriosus, and delayed gross motor development. However, the effect of CCDC142 may have been confounded for these phenotypes since there were also abnormalities in many other genomic sections.

=== Mutations ===
There are a number of SNPs located in the CCDC142 gene. Some of these in the promoter region and 5’ UTR are within anchor sequences for transcription factors, and affect transcription factor binding if they are changed.

There are many SNPs in the protein's coding sequence which change CCDC142's amino acid composition. One SNP with a high prevalence rate in the population (1.8%) is notable for its change in chemistry, with a tyrosine to an asparagine shift at amino acid 548.

There are also numerous SNPs located in the large 3’ UTR of the gene, with many of these binding to areas containing stem loop structures in the mRNA. An SNP with a 7.7% prevalence rate (guanine to adenosine at bp4285) is in the 3’ UTR but not located in the conserved stem loop region.

These SNPs have been annotated in the Conceptual Translation located in the Protein section above.

== Multiple Sequence Alignment ==
Distant Ortholog Multiple Sequence Alignment of CCDC142

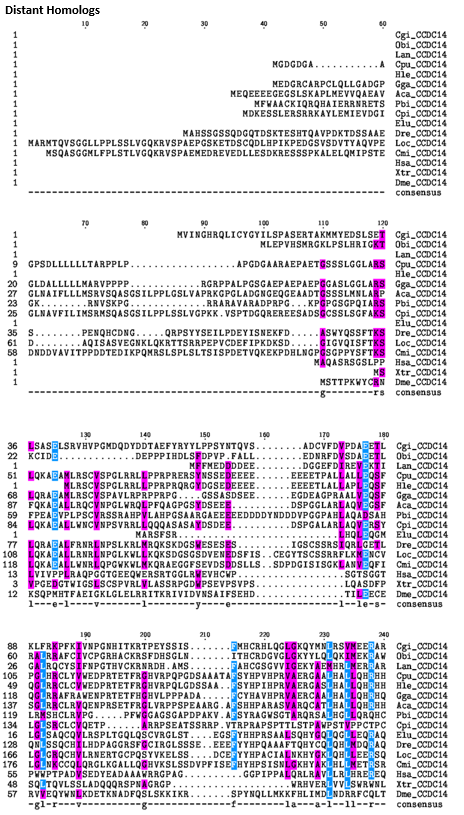

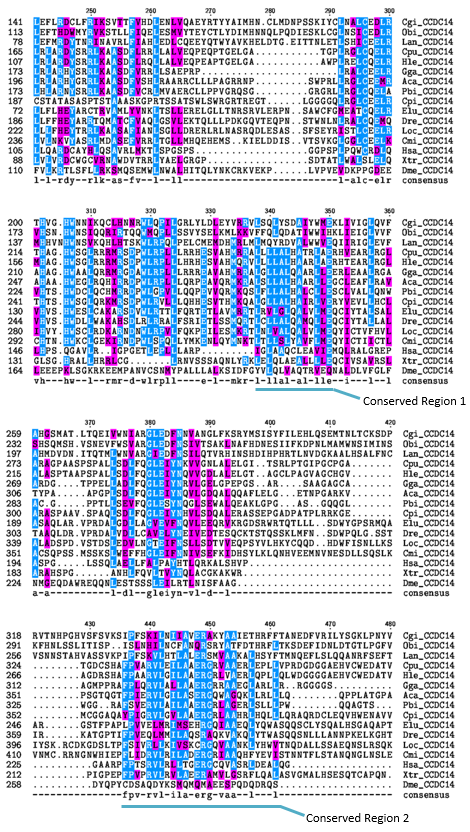

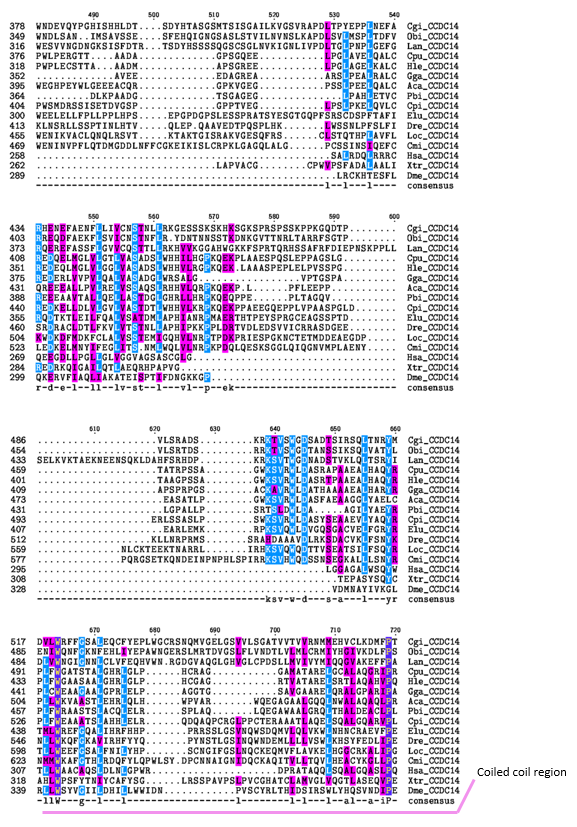
Purple=Similar Amino Acid Chemistry
Blue=Same Amino Acid

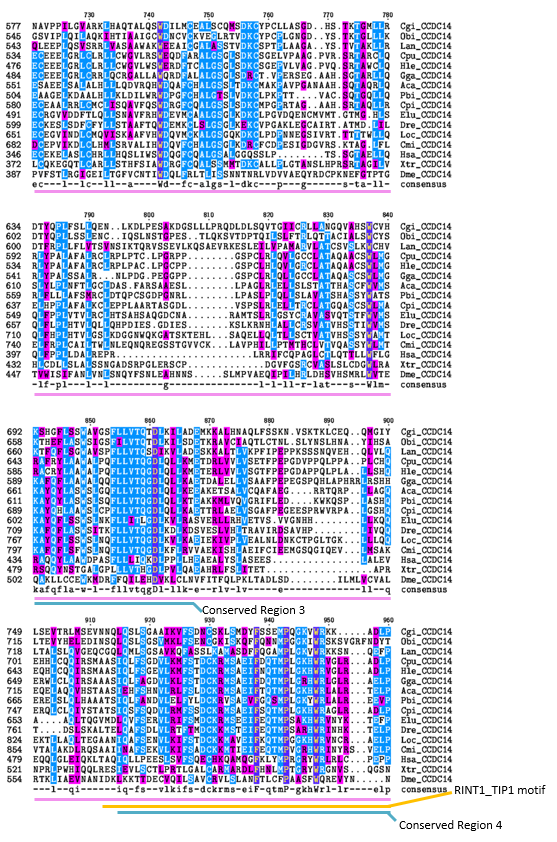

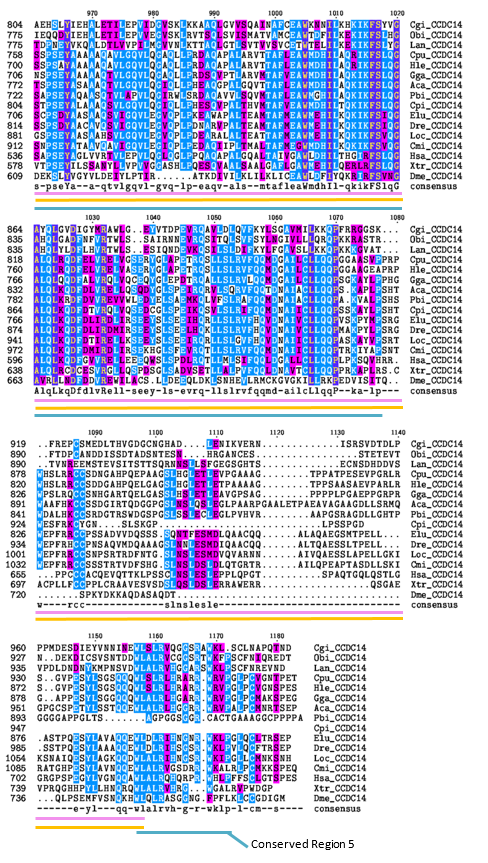

In the Multiple Sequence Alignment above (created using the CLUSTALW and TEXSHADE programs at SDSC Biology Workbench), organisms are labeled by the first letter of their genus and the first two letters of their species. The whole CCDC142 protein is highly conserved in mammals. The regions containing the Homo sapiens coiled-coil domain and the RINT1_TIP1 motif region are highly conserved in distant homologs. 12 of the 15 amino acids that match across all organisms in this region are nonpolar. Conserved Region 1 contains mostly nonpolar amino acids. Conserved Region 2 contains mostly nonpolar and basic amino acids. Conserved Region 3 contains both polar and nonpolar amino acids. Conserved Region 5 contains mostly nonpolar and basic amino acids.

== Additional Transcription Factor Information ==
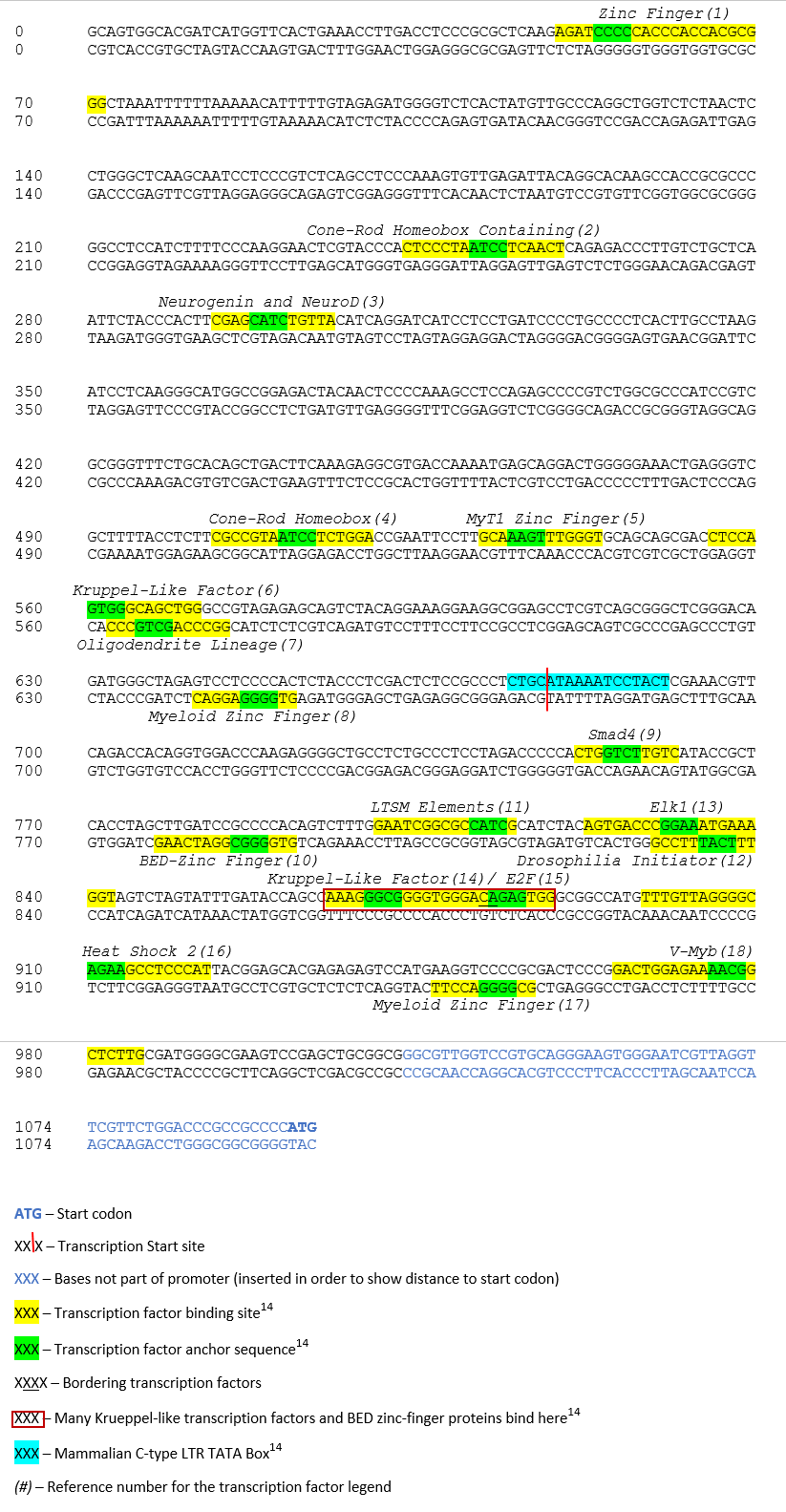
Transcription Factor Binding Site Annotation

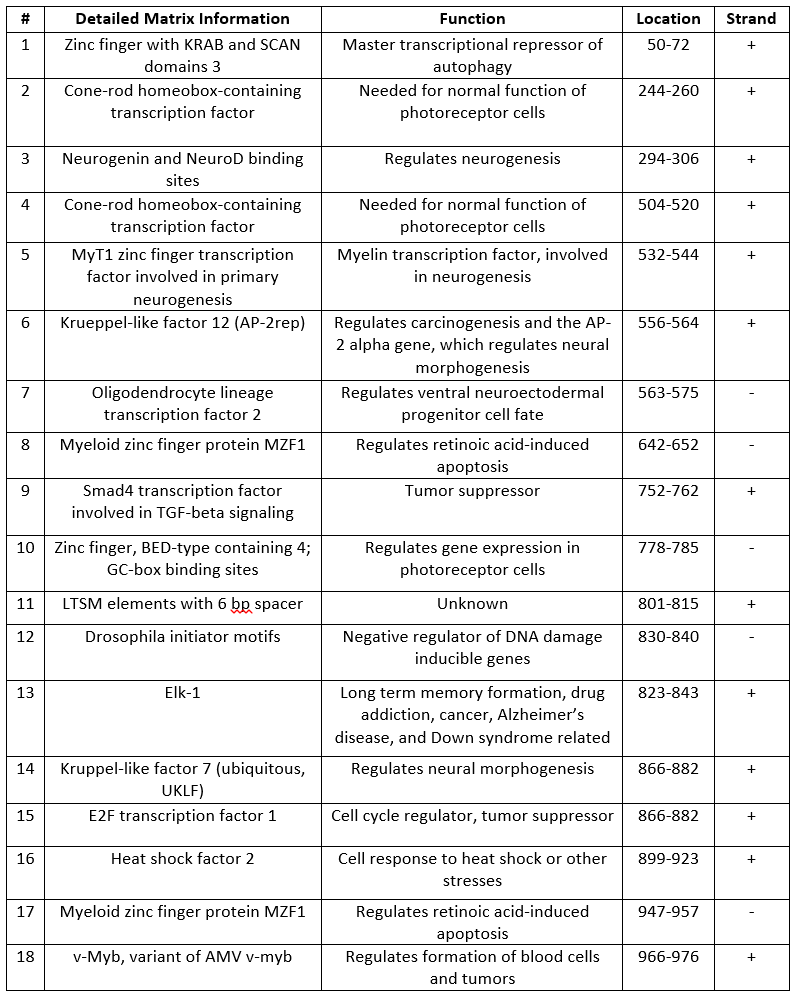
Transcription Factor Binding Site Legend
