= ZBED8 =

Identifiers
- Aliases: ZBED8, Buster3, C5orf54, zinc finger BED-type containing 8, FAM200C
- External IDs: OMIM: 615253; GeneCards: ZBED8

Gene location (Human)
Chr.	Chromosome 5 (human)
Band	5q33.3	Start	160,393,148 bp
Band	5q33.3	End	160,400,054 bp
RNA expression pattern
Bgee	Human / Mouse (ortholog); Top expressed in: ventricular zone; ganglionic eminence; testicle; cerebellar hemisphere; right hemisphere of cerebellum; pituitary gland; anterior pituitary; left ovary; right ovary; canal of the cervix / n/a; More reference expression data
BioGPS	n/a
Gene ontology
Molecular function	protein binding; DNA-binding transcription factor activity, RNA polymerase II-specific; DNA binding
Cellular component	cytoplasm; nucleoplasm
Biological process	regulation of transcription by RNA polymerase II
Sources:Amigo / QuickGO
Orthologs
Databases	NCBI: entry; OMA: entry
Species	Human	Mouse
Entrez	63920	n/a
Ensembl	ENSG00000221886	n/a
UniProt	Q8IZ13	n/a
RefSeq (mRNA)	NM_022090; NM_001303251	n/a
RefSeq (protein)	NP_001290180; NP_071373	n/a
Location (UCSC)	Chr 5: 160.39 – 160.4 Mb	n/a
PubMed search		n/a
- Wikidata
View/Edit Human

Family with Member 200 C (FAM200C) is a protein, which in humans is encoded by the FAM200C gene. The primary aliases of the gene are ZBED8, C5orf54, and Buster3.

== Gene ==
In the human genome, FAM200C is located on the minus strand of chromosome 5, at 5q33.3. FAM200C can be transcribed into 2 different transcript variants, which contain 3 and 2 exons, respectively.

Location of FAM200C on Human Chromosome 5, specifically 5q33.3

=== Expression ===
FAM200C is expressed ubiquitously and variably in human tissues, with a 10-fold difference between the lowest and highest expression values (~0.23-2.3). FAM200C has the highest tissue expression in the ovaries, followed by the endometrium, thyroid, testis, and prostate.

== mRNA ==
FAM200C mRNA has 2 transcript variants. FAM200C Variant 1 is the longest in terms of nucleotide length, spanning 2,882 nucleotides.

FAM200C Transcript Variants
Transcript Variant	Variant Length (nt)	Accession Number	Protein	Protein Length (aa)
FAM200C Variant 1	2,882	NM_001303251.2	NP_001290180.1	594
FAM200C Variant 2	2,808	NM_022090.5	NP_071373.2	594

== Protein ==
The Family with Sequence Similarity 200 Member C protein in Homo sapiens is encoded by the FAM200C gene. Protein FAM200C has a predicted molecular weight of 68326.71 Da, with a theoretical isoelectric point of 5.98. The protein is localized to the Nucleoplasm.

=== Promoter ===
Using UCSC's Genome Browser, a promoter region sequence was found. The most likely promoter region for FAM200C starts at 160,399,954 and goes to 160,400,554, with a length of 601 base pairs.

=== Protein interactions ===
FAM200C Predicted Functional Partners from STRING
Protein	Full Name	Description	Score
METTL21A	Methyltransferase 21A, HSPA Lysine	Enables ATPase binding activity, Hsp70 protein binding activity, and protein-lysine N-methyltransferase activity	0.732
PGBD2	PiggyBac transposable element derived 2	Protein-coding gene, that interacts directly with DNA.	0.692
THAP9	THAP domain containing 9	Enables sequence-specific DNA binding activity and transposase activity.	0.586
GIN1	Gypsy retrotransposon integrase 1	Predicted to enable nucleic acid binding activity.	0.541
CRLF3	Cytokine receptor like factor 3	Encodes a cytokine receptor-like factor that may negatively regulate cell cycle progression at the G0/G1 phase.	0.505
ZNF862	Zinc finger protein 862	Predicted to enable protein dimerization activity and zinc ion binding activity.	0.501
POGK	Pogo transposable element derived with KRAB domain	Contains a KRAB domain at the N-terminus and a transposase domain at the C-terminus.	0.499
PGBD1	PiggyBac transposable element derived 1	Belongs to the subfamily of piggyBac transposable element derived genes; expressed in the brain.	0.489
PGBD5	PiggyBac transposable element derived 5	Belongs to the subfamily of piggyBac transposable element derived genes.	0.477
NAIF1	Nuclear apoptosis inducing factor 1	Predicted to be involved in negative regulation of cell growth and regulation of mitochondrial membrane permeability involved in apoptotic process.	0.460

=== Structure ===
==== Secondary structure ====
The figure "FAM200C Predicted Secondary Structure" 1 and 2 provide a Phyre2.2 model prediction of FAM200C's secondary structure. Model indicates secondary structure is predicted to be composed of 9% disordered, 45% alpha helices, and 8% beta strands.

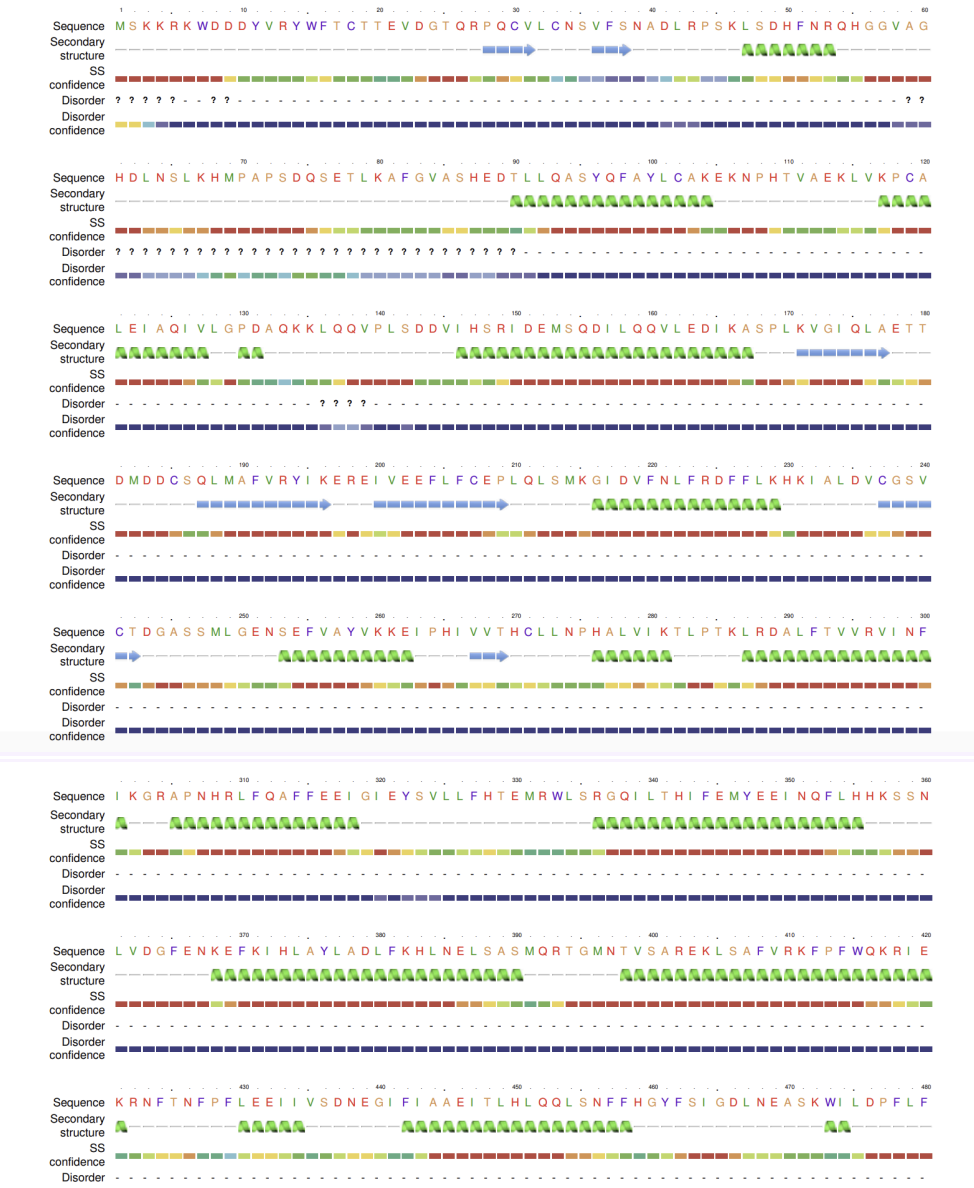
FAM200C Predicted Secondary Structure 1

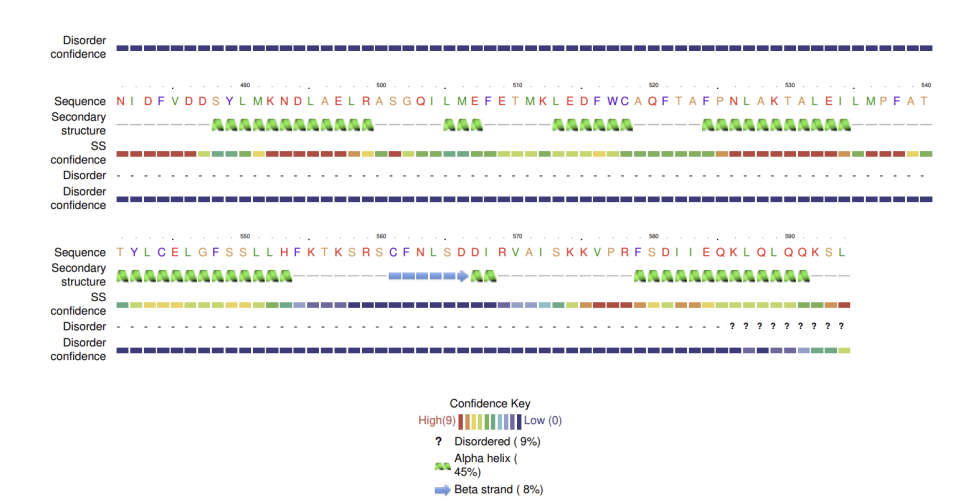
FAM200C Predicted Secondary Structure 2

==== Tertiary structure ====
FAM200C tertiary structure predictions available through Phyre2.2 and AlphaFold.

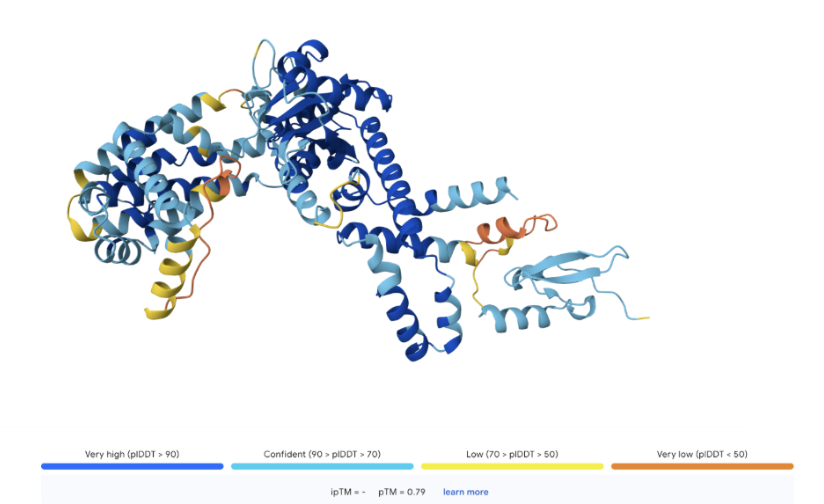
Predicted Tertiary Structure of FAM200C made through Phyre2.2

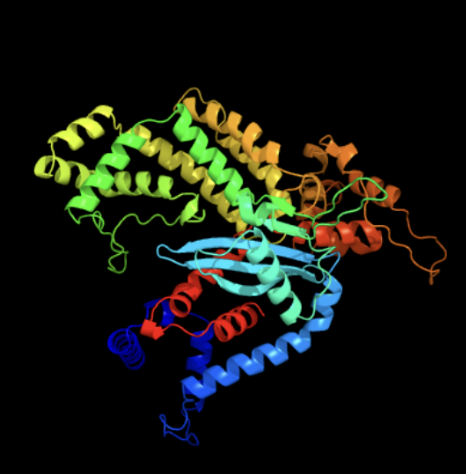
Predicted FAM200C Tertiary Structure made through AlphaFold

== Gene ontology ==
The figure titled "FAM200C Mature miRNA Sequences by Target Score" shows the 8 mature miRNA sequences for FAM200C available through text mining.

FAM200C Mature miRNA Sequences by Target Score
miRNA Name	Target Score	Seed Location	miRNA Sequence
hsa-miR-767-5p	76	291	UGCACCAUGGUUGUCUGAGCAUG
hsa-miR-627-3p	73	171, 321	UCUUUUCUUUGAGACUCACU
hsa-miR-550a-3p	70	454	UGUCUUACUCCCUCAGGCACAU
hsa-miR-4524a-3p	65	64	UGAGACAGGCUUAUGCUGCUAU
hsa-miR-942-5p	62	326	UCUUCUCUGUUUUGGCCAUGUG
hsa-miR-449c-5p	60	188	UAGGCAGUGUAUUGCUAGCGGCUGU
hsa-miR-34b-5p	60	188	UAGGCAGUGUCAUUAGCUGAUUG
hsa-miR-376c-3p	60	95	AACAUAGAGGAAAUUCCACGU

== Evolutionary history ==
FAM200C first arose around 94 million years ago. FAM200C is part of the Ribonuclease H-like superfamily. A Swedish University for Agricultural Sciences research team led by Dr.Alexander Hayward and Dr.Awaisa Ghazal, studying the evolutionary origins of the ZBED genes published a paper in PLOS one, reporting that: "ZBED proteins, such as C5ORF54, or ZBED8, originated from domesticated hAT DNA transposons and encode regulatory proteins with diverse, fundamental functions in vertebrates."

=== Orthologs ===
FAM200C orthologs were found exclusively in mammals. The most distantly related ortholog, Talpa occidentalis, has two transcript variants.

Orthologs of FAM200C protein in order of increasing divergence from Homo sapiens
Taxonomic Class	Taxonomic Order	Genus and Species	Common Name	Date of Divergence (MYA)	Accession Number	Sequence Length (aa)	Sequence Identity (%)	Sequence Similarity (%)
Mammalia	Primates	Homo sapiens	Human	0	NP_001290180.1	594	100	100
Mammalia	Primates	Gorilla gorilla gorilla	Gorilla	8.6	XP_004042980.2	594	99	100
Mammalia	Primates	Macaca nemestrina	Pig-tailed macaque	28.8	XP_001084430.1	593	98	99
Mammalia	Primates	Trachypithecus francoisi	Francois' langur	28.8	XP_033036286.1	593	98	99
Mammalia	Primates	Cebus imitator	Panamanian white-faced capuchin	43	XP_017357604.1	594	97	100
Mammalia	Primates	Saimiri boliviensis	Bolivian squirrel monkey	43	XP_074246649.1	633	97	100
Mammalia	Primates	Otolemur garnettii	Small-eared gelago	74	XP_012664265.1	594	94	100
Mammalia	Artiodactyla	Camelus dromedarius	Arabian camel	94	XP_010991120.3	594	94	100
Mammalia	Perissodactyla	Equus quagga	Plains zebra	94	XP_046524538.1	641	94	100
Mammalia	Carnivora	Leopardus geoffroyi	Geoffroy's cat	94	XP_045358866.1	594	94	100
Mammalia	Carnivora	Mirounga leonina	Southern elephant seal	94	XP_034869533.1	594	94	100
Mammalia	Carnivora	Zalophus californianus	California sea lion	94	XP_027462964.1	639	94	100
Mammalia	Carnivora	Vulpes lagopus	Arctic fox	94	XP_041602806.1	593	94	100
Mammalia	Carnivora	Neogale vison	American mink	94	XP_044086173.1	594	93	100
Mammalia	Carnivora	Mustela lutreola	European mink	94	XP_059030193.1	549	93	100
Mammalia	Chiroptera	Pteronotus mesoamericanus	Pteronotus parnellii mesoamericanus	94	XP_054423860.1	594	93	100
Mammalia	Chiroptera	Molossus molossus	Pallas' mastiff bat	94	XP_036098001.1	594	92	100
Mammalia	Eulipotypha	Talpa occidentalis	Iberian mole	94	XP_036098001.1	594	92	100

=== Paralogs ===
FAM200C has 18 paralogs. Based on target % identity to FAM200C (>20%), the three most significant paralogs are FAM200A, FAM200B, and ZBED5.

FAM200C Paralogs with >20% Target Identity
Name	Full Name	Target % Identity	Sequence Length (aa)	Accession Number	Location
FAM200A	Family with Sequence Similarity 200 Member A	29.49	573	ENSG00000221909	7:99,546,300-99,559,392:-1
FAM200B	Family with Sequence Similarity 200 Member B	29.70	657	ENSG00000237765	4:15,681,506-15,690,447:1
ZBED5	Zinc Finger BED-type Containing 5	27.13	693	ENSG00000236287	11:10,812,074-10,858,796:-1

=== Multiple sequence alignment ===
The figure titled "Snippet of FAM200C Orthologs Multiple Sequence Alignment" shows a snippet of the multiple sequence alignment for FAM200C orthologs. This snippet represents the conservation of FAM200C as most of the sequence is conserved.

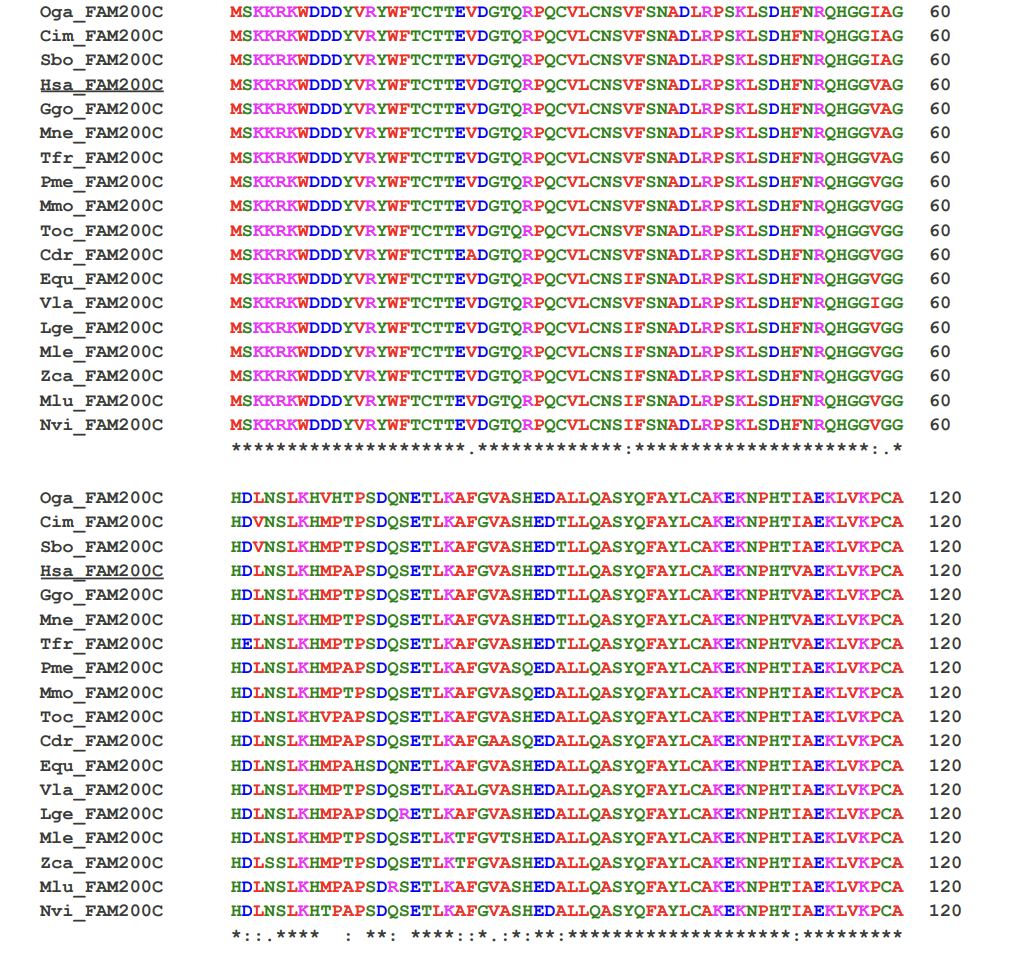
Snippet of FAM200C Orthologs Multiple Sequence Alignment

=== Protein divergence ===
As shown in the figure titled "Informational context of FAM200C human protein...", the human FAM200C protein, is evolving slowly over time in comparison to both Fibrinogen Alpha and Cytochrome C.

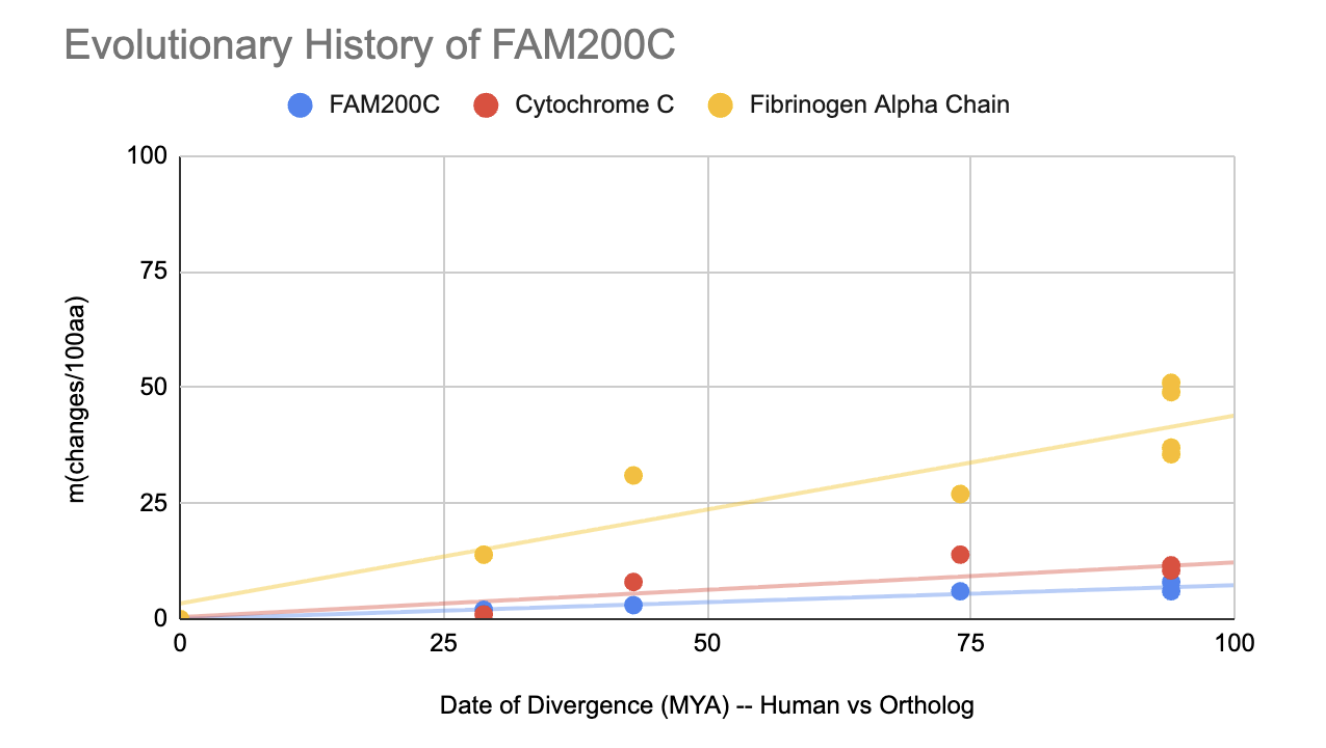
Informational Context of FAM200C Human Protein in Comparison to Cytochrome C and Fibrinogen Alpha Through Alignment of 8 Orthologs

== Conceptual translation ==
The figure titled "Conceptual Translation for FAM200C" shows the conceptual translation (full mRNA and amino acid sequence) of the human FAM200C transcript variant 1 showing exon boundaries, domains/motifs, polyadenylation sites, and phosphorylation sites, and a legend.

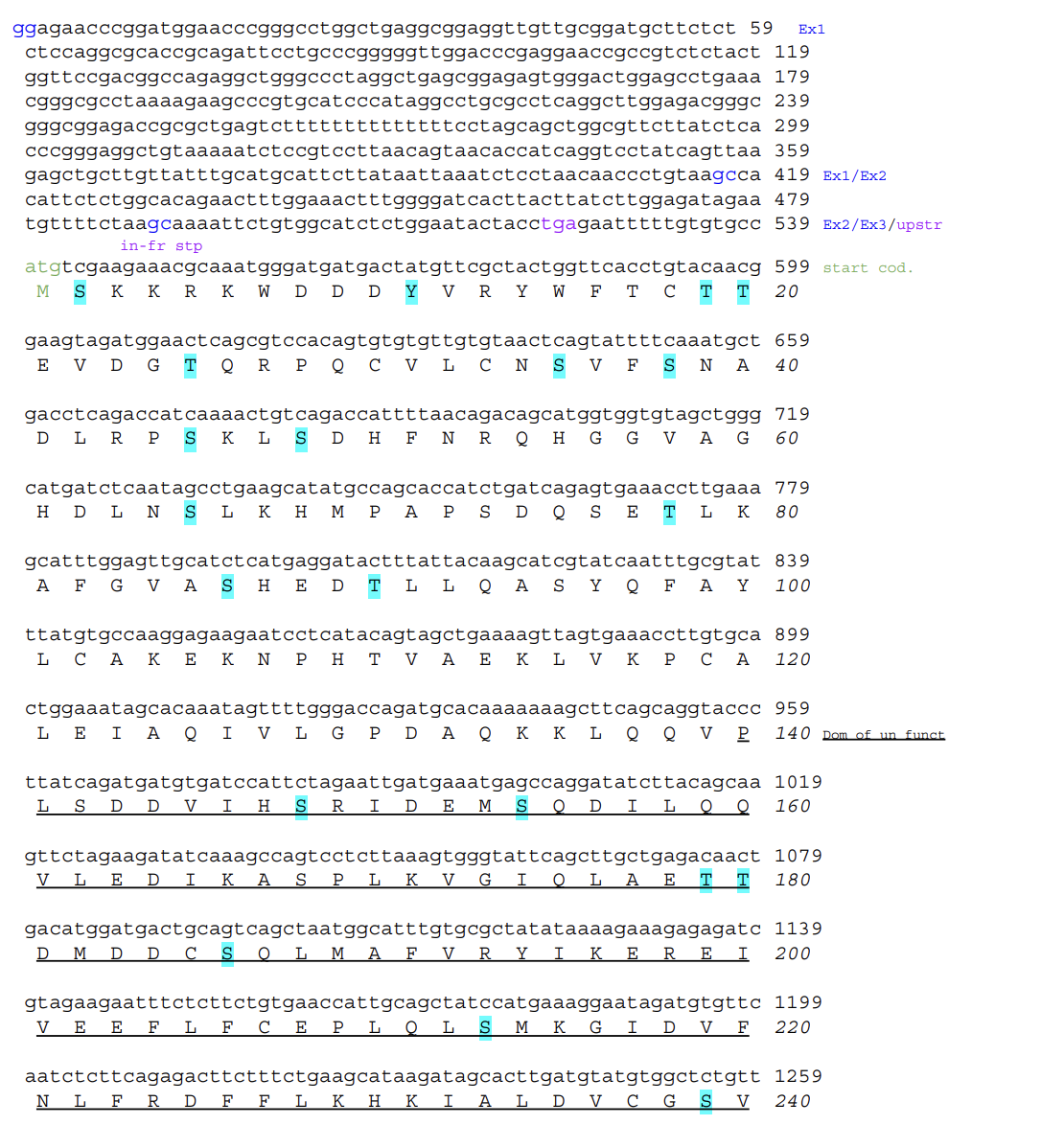
Conceptual translation of FAM200C 1

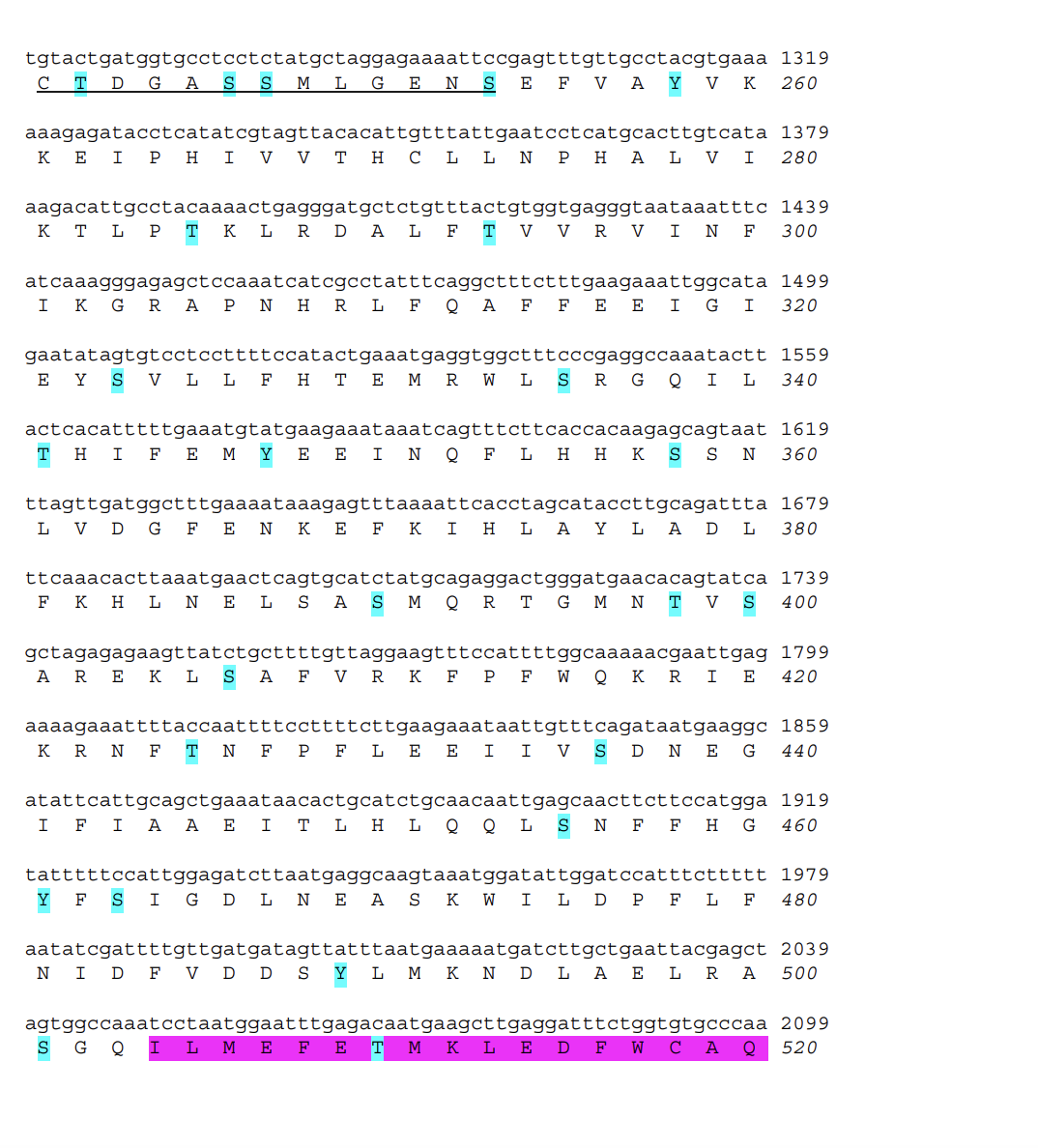
Conceptual translation of FAM200C 2

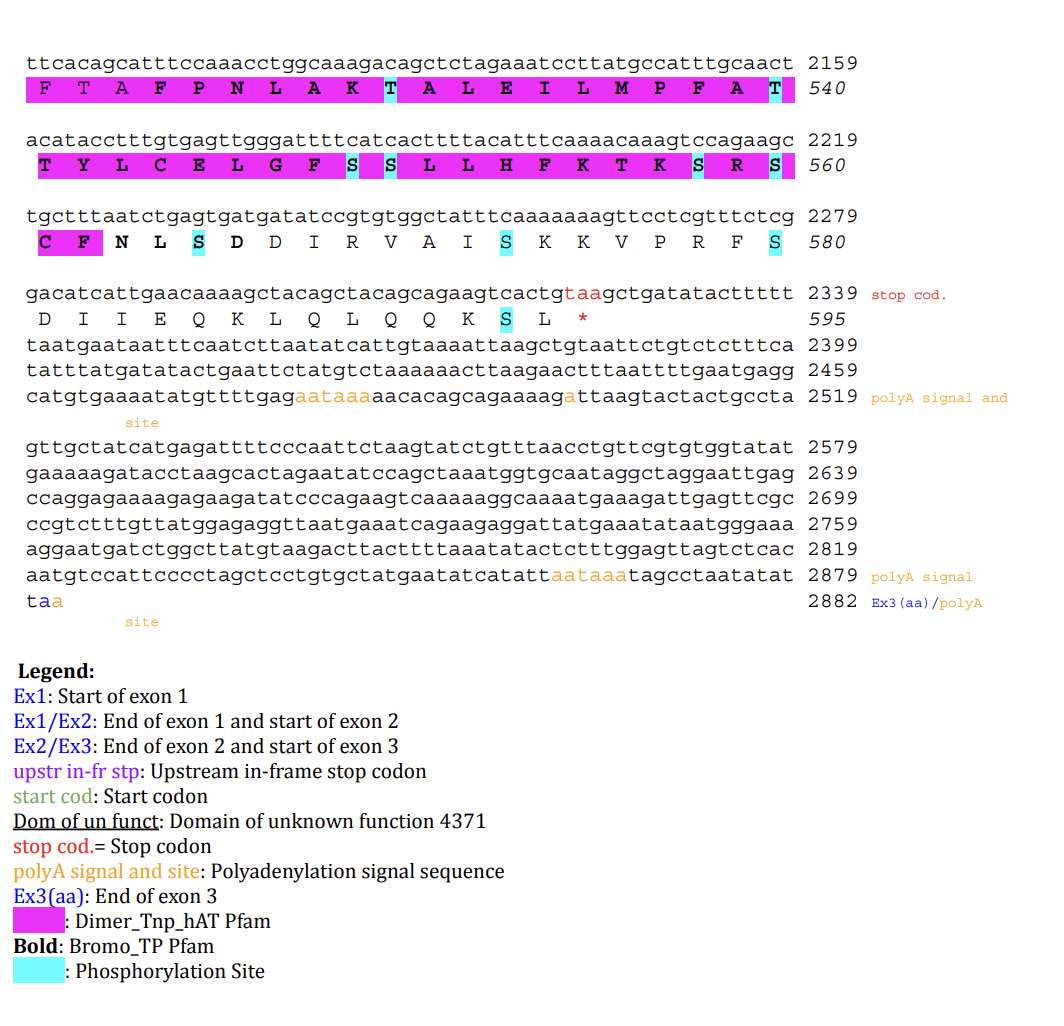
Conceptual translation of FAM200C 3

== Single nucleotide polymorphisms ==
There are 3734 single nucleotide polymorphisms catalogued in NCBI's Variation Viewer, only one of which has a clinical significance record. The only clinically significant single nucleotide polymorphism found, rs61740683, is a synonymous, single nucleotide variant with benign clinical significance.

== Clinical significance ==
FAM200C promoter could have a dual function as it starts transcription for the FAM200C gene and also an enhancer for the gene miR-146a. In a 2023 study published to the Arthritis and Rheumatology Journal for the American College of Rheumatology, researchers Xinyi Zhu, et al. discovered that when the FAM200C gene was knocked down, the expression levels for miR-146a were unaffected. This suggests that the promoter regions could also function as enhancers and regulate the expression of genes in close proximity. FAM200C is also a potential biomarker for Sarcoidosis. In a 2020 study published to the Medical Science Monitor, Min Zhao et al. identified FAM200C as a "SARC-only DEG". The researchers found that FAM200C is up-regulated in Sarcoidosis, meaning there is increased gene expression in patients with Sarcoidosis compared to patients with Pulmonary Tuberculosis and healthy control patients.
