= Suman Kumar Dhar =

Indian biologist (born 1968)

- Born: 6 March 1968 (age 58); Kalimpong, West Bengal, India
- Education: Burdwan University; Kalyani University; Jawaharlal Nehru University; University of Virginia; Harvard Medical School
- Known for: Studies on Helicobacter pylori and Plasmodium falciparum
- Awards: 2010 National Bioscience Award for Career Development; 2012 Shanti Swarup Bhatnagar Prize
- Scientific career
- Fields: Parasitology; Molecular biology
- Workplaces: Jawaharlal Nehru University; Harvard Medical School; Harvard School of Public Health; Bernhard Nocht Institute for Tropical Medicine

Suman Kumar Dhar (born 1968) is an Indian molecular biologist and a professor at the Special Centre for Molecular Medicine of Jawaharlal Nehru University. He is known for his studies on the DNA replication and cell cycle regulation in Helicobacter pylori and Plasmodium falciparum, two pathogens affecting humans. An elected fellow of the National Academy of Sciences, India, Indian National Science Academy and the Indian Academy of Sciences, he is also a recipient of the National Bioscience Award for Career Development of the Department of Biotechnology in 2010. The Council of Scientific and Industrial Research, the apex agency of the Government of India for scientific research, awarded him the Shanti Swarup Bhatnagar Prize for Science and Technology, one of the highest Indian science awards, in 2012, for his contributions to biological sciences.

== Biography ==
Suman Kumar Dhar, born on 6 March 1968 in the Indian state of West Bengal, graduated in chemistry from Burdwan University in 1989 and completed his master's degree in biochemistry in 1992 from Kalyani University before securing a PhD in molecular biology from Jawaharlal Nehru University (JNU) in 1998.

He worked from 1997 to 1998 as a research assistant at the department of microbiology of the University of Nebraska Medical Center. Next, he did his post-doctoral studies at Brigham and Women’s Hospital of Harvard Medical School which he completed in 2001.

Returning to India the same year, he joined Jawaharlal Nehru University as an assistant professor at the Special Centre for Molecular Medicine (SCMM) of the university where he rose in ranks to become an associate professor in 2005 and a professor in 2011, finally reaching the position of the chairperson of SCMM in 2011. In between, he served as a visiting fellow at Harvard Medical School from 2002 to 2003), the Harvard School of Public Health from 2003 and 2004, and the Bernhard Nocht Institute for Tropical Medicine in 2007. He also served as a Humboldt Research Fellow at Bernhard Nocht Institute in 2008. Besides his academic duties at JNU, Dhar is involved in the establishment of Centre of Excellence in Parasitology, a Department of Biotechnology-funded project. He was also a member of the proctorial committee constituted by JNU to inquire about the 2016 JNU protests.

== Career ==
Dhar's research history starts during his graduate studies when he worked on Entamoeba histolytica, the protozoan which causes amoebiasis, focusing on its ribosomal DNA circle. Later at Harvard Medical School, his post-doctoral studies were centered on mammalian DNA replication which assisted him to identify the ORC6 (origin recognition complex subunit six) and its role in viral DNA replication. He also identified geminin, a replication inhibitor, as a blocking factor of viral DNA replication, a discovery which earned him a US patent. Later, he studied the human pathogens, Helicobacter pylori and Plasmodium falciparum and their DNA replication and cell cycle regulation. He also worked on anti-malarial drugs and proposed Acriflavine as an anti-malarial agent, which has also been patented by him. His work has identified PfGyrase for P. falciparum and HpDnaB helicase for H. pylori as targets and these researches are reported to be helpful in drug discovery efforts for Gastric ulcers, Gastric adenocarcinomas and Malaria. Dhar has documented his research by way of a number of articles (Note: Please see Selected bibliography section) and online repositories such as PubMed and Pubfacts have listed many of them. He has contributed chapters to three books which include Epigenetics: Development and Disease by Tapas Kumar Kundu. He is associated with many science journals such as Journal of Biological Chemistry, Molecular Microbiology, FEBS Journal and Medical Science Monitor as an ad-hoc reviewer and has delivered featured talks including his oration at the Gordon Research Conference on Host-Parasite interaction held in Rhode Island in 2012.

== Awards and honors ==
While in the US, Dhar received two grants for his researches, a grant from the National Institutes of Health for studies on emerging infectious diseases (1997–98) and the United States Department of the Army grant for research on breast cancer (2000–03). He received the Senior International Research Fellowship of the Wellcome Trust in 2005, the tenancy of the fellowship extending to 2010, and on its expiry, he received the Wellcome Trust-DBT Senior Research Fellowship in 2010. In 2006, Dhar received the Swarnajayanthi Fellowship of the Department of Biotechnology (DBT) and four years later, DBT honored him again with the 2010 National Bioscience Award for Career Development. He was elected to the Guha Research Conference in 2007 and the next year brought him the Alexander Von Humboldt Fellowship and the Swarnajayanti Fellowship of the Department of Science and Technology.

A member of the American Society for Microbiology, Dhar was awarded the Shanti Swarup Bhatnagar Prize for Science and Technology, one of the highest Indian science awards, by the Council of Scientific and Industrial Research in 2012. The National Academy of Sciences, India elected him as a fellow in 2011 and he became a fellow of the Indian National Science Academy and the Indian Academy of Sciences in 2016.

== Patents ==
- Anindya Dutta, Suman Kumar Dhar (2001). "Geminin and ORC3N Inhibit Replication of Herpes Viruses, Pamiloma Viruses and Polyoma Viruses" (PDF). Patent No. No. B0801.70253US00. Dhar Suman Kumar.
- Suman Kumar Dhar; Srikanta Dana; Dhaneswar Prusty; Ashraf Dar; Pritam Mukhopadhyay (24 August 2012). "Method of screening anti-plasmodial activity of acriflavin and acriflavin as an anti-malarial agent". Patent No. WO2014030171 A1. Dhar Suman Kumar.

== Selected bibliography ==
- Vijay Verma; Ajay Kumar; Ram Gopal Nitharwal; Jawed Alam; Asish Kumar Mukhopadhyay; Santanu Dasgupta; Suman Kumar Dhar (December 2014). "Modulation of the enzymatic activities of replicative helicase (DnaB) by interaction with Hp0897: a possible mechanism for helicase loading in Helicobacter pylori". Nucleic Acids Research. 44 (7): 3288–3303. doi:10.1093/nar/gkw148. PMC 4838378. PMID 27001508.
- Wohlschlegel JA, Dwyer BT, Dhar SK, Cvetic C, Walter JC, Dutta A (December 2000). "Inhibition of eukaryotic DNA replication by geminin binding to Cdt1". Science. 290 (5500): 2309–12. Bibcode:2000Sci...290.2309W. doi:10.1126/science.290.5500.2309. PMID 11125146.
- Wohlschlegel JA, Dhar SK, Prokhorova TA, Dutta A, Walter JC (February 2002). "Xenopus Mcm10 binds to origins of DNA replication after Mcm2-7 and stimulates origin binding of Cdc45". Mol Cell. 9 (2): 233–40. doi:10.1016/s1097-2765(02)00456-2. PMID 11864598.
- Dhar SK, Yoshida K, Machida Y, Khaira P, Chaudhuri B, Wohlschlegel JA, Leffak M, Yates J, Dutta A (August 2001). "Replication from oriP of Epstein-Barr virus requires human ORC and is inhibited by geminin". Cell. 106 (3): 287–96. doi:10.1016/s0092-8674(01)00458-5. PMID 11509178. S2CID 12479646.

== See also ==
- Entamoeba histolytica
- Amoebiasis
- ORC6
- Geminin
- Helicobacter pylori
- Plasmodium falciparum
- Acriflavine
- Tapas Kumar Kundu
