= CGGBP1 =

Protein-coding gene in humans

Identifiers
- Aliases: CGGBP1, CGGBP, p20-CGGBP, CGG triplet repeat binding protein 1
- External IDs: OMIM: 603363; MGI: 2146370; GeneCards: CGGBP1

Gene location (Human)
Chr.	Chromosome 3 (human)
Band	3p11.1	Start	88,051,944 bp
Band	3p11.1	End	88,149,885 bp

Gene location (Mouse)
Chr.	Chromosome 16 (mouse)
Band	16|16 C1.3	Start	64,672,359 bp
Band	16|16 C1.3	End	64,679,870 bp
RNA expression pattern
Bgee	Human / Mouse (ortholog); Top expressed in: germinal epithelium; visceral pleura; epithelium of nasopharynx; ventricular zone; parietal pleura; ganglionic eminence; pancreatic ductal cell; superficial temporal artery; tibia; lymph node / Top expressed in: medial ganglionic eminence; Paneth cell; vestibular membrane of cochlear duct; ciliary body; vas deferens; cumulus cell; renal corpuscle; seminal vesicula; left lung lobe; atrioventricular junction; More reference expression data
BioGPS	n/a
Gene ontology
Molecular function	DNA binding; RNA polymerase II transcription regulatory region sequence-specific DNA binding; protein binding; DNA-binding transcription repressor activity, RNA polymerase II-specific; double-stranded DNA binding; identical protein binding
Cellular component	nucleus; nucleoplasm
Biological process	regulation of transcription, DNA-templated; negative regulation of transcription by RNA polymerase II; transcription, DNA-templated; regulation of transcription by RNA polymerase II
Sources:Amigo / QuickGO
Orthologs
Databases	NCBI: entry; OMA: entry
Species	Human	Mouse
Entrez	8545	106143
Ensembl	ENSG00000163320	ENSMUSG00000054604
UniProt	Q9UFW8	Q8BHG9
RefSeq (mRNA)	NM_001008390; NM_001195308; NM_003663	NM_178647; NM_001357416
RefSeq (protein)	NP_001008391; NP_001182237; NP_003654	NP_848762; NP_001344345
Location (UCSC)	Chr 3: 88.05 – 88.15 Mb	Chr 16: 64.67 – 64.68 Mb
PubMed search
- Wikidata
View/Edit Human	View/Edit Mouse

CGG triplet repeat-binding protein 1 is a protein that in humans is encoded by the CGGBP1 gene.

The existence of a CGG-binding factor was recognised in 1990 and the protein was identified by Deissler and colleagues in 1997. It has 167 amino acids and a mass of 20kDa and includes a C2H2 zinc finger DNA-binding domain. The human gene is on chromosome 3 at 3p11.1, right next to the centromere, where it has four known promoters. CGGBP1 appears to have evolved from hAT transposons and is found in all amniotes.

The protein binds to CGG trinucleotide repeats to regulate transcription (including inhibiting Alu elements) and translation. It is essential to cell survival, having wide cytoprotective functions including DNA repair and telomere maintenance. Because the gene's promoters include CGG repeats, it is self-regulatory.

CGGBP1 influences expression of the fragile X mental retardation gene, FMR1, by specifically interacting with the CGG trinucleotide repeat in its 5-prime UTR, the untranslated regulatory region upstream of the gene's coding sequence.
