= ZW10 =

Identifiers
- Aliases: ZW10, HKNTC1AP, zw10 kinetochore protein
- External IDs: OMIM: 603954; MGI: 1349478; HomoloGene: 37959; GeneCards: ZW10; OMA:ZW10 - orthologs

Gene location (Human)
| Chr. | Chromosome 11 (human) |
| Band | 11q23.2 | Start | 113,733,187 bp |
| Band | 11q23.2 | End | 113,773,735 bp |

Gene location (Mouse)
| Chr. | Chromosome 9 (mouse) |
| Band | 9|9 A5.3 | Start | 48,966,913 bp |
| Band | 9|9 A5.3 | End | 48,990,075 bp |
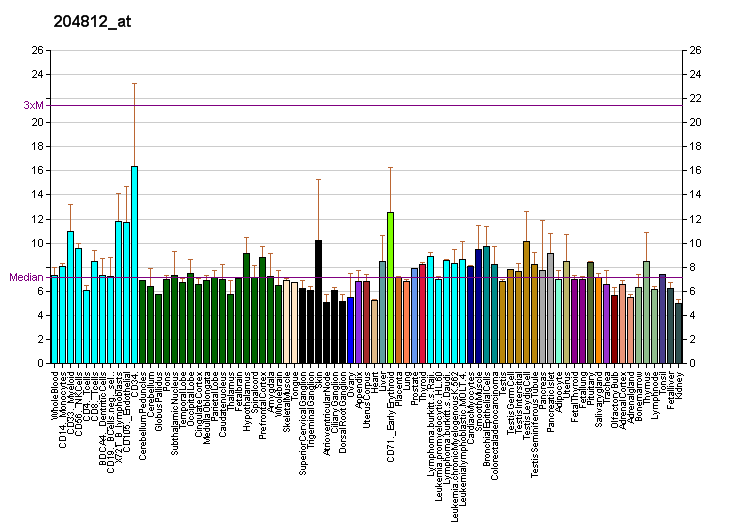
RNA expression pattern
| Bgee | Human / Mouse (ortholog); Top expressed in: tibialis anterior muscle; ventricular zone; secondary oocyte; mucosa of ileum; gastrocnemius muscle; Achilles tendon; cartilage tissue; skin of leg; ganglionic eminence; testicle / Top expressed in: gastrula; primary oocyte; condyle; submandibular gland; fossa; fetal liver hematopoietic progenitor cell; primitive streak; hair follicle; maxillary prominence; motor neuron; More reference expression data |
| BioGPS | More reference expression data |
Gene ontology
| Molecular function | centromeric DNA binding; protein binding |
| Cellular component | spindle pole; kinetochore microtubule; endoplasmic reticulum membrane; spindle; chromosome; RZZ complex; Dsl1/NZR complex; chromosome, centromeric region; cytoskeleton; kinetochore; membrane; endoplasmic reticulum; nucleus; cytoplasm; cytosol |
| Biological process | Golgi organization; mitotic cell cycle checkpoint signaling; mitotic spindle assembly checkpoint signaling; cell division; endoplasmic reticulum to Golgi vesicle-mediated transport; establishment of mitotic spindle orientation; mitotic sister chromatid segregation; protein transport; cell cycle; mitotic metaphase plate congression; regulation of exit from mitosis; protein localization to kinetochore; vesicle-mediated transport; sister chromatid cohesion; retrograde vesicle-mediated transport, Golgi to endoplasmic reticulum; meiosis; mitotic cell cycle; transport; protein-containing complex assembly |
Sources:Amigo / QuickGO
Orthologs
| Species | Human | Mouse |
| Entrez | 9183 | 26951 |
| Ensembl | ENSG00000086827 | ENSMUSG00000032264 |
| UniProt | O43264 | O54692 |
| RefSeq (mRNA) | NM_004724 | NM_012039 |
| RefSeq (protein) | NP_004715 | NP_036169 |
| Location (UCSC) | Chr 11: 113.73 – 113.77 Mb | Chr 9: 48.97 – 48.99 Mb |
| PubMed search |
- Wikidata
| View/Edit Human | View/Edit Mouse |

Centromere/kinetochore protein zw10 homolog is a protein that in humans is encoded by the ZW10 gene. This gene encodes a protein that is one of many involved in mechanisms to ensure proper chromosome segregation during cell division. The encoded protein binds to centromeres during the prophase, metaphase, and early anaphase cell division stages and to kinetochore microtubules during metaphase.

== Function ==
Zw10

Identifiers
- Symbol: Zw10
- Pfam: PF06248
- Pfam clan: CL0295
- InterPro: IPR009361
Available protein structures:
- Pfam: structures / ECOD
- PDB: RCSB PDB; PDBe; PDBj
- PDBsum: structure summary

Zeste white 10 (ZW10) was initially identified as a mitotic checkpoint protein involved in chromosome segregation, and then implicated in targeting cytoplasmic dynein and dynactin to mitotic kinetochores, but it is also important in non-dividing cells. These include cytoplasmic dynein targeting to Golgi and other membranes, and SNARE-mediated ER-Golgi trafficking. Dominant-negative ZW10, anti-ZW10 antibody, and ZW10 RNA interference (RNAi) cause Golgi dispersal. ZW10 RNAi also disperse endosomes and lysosomes.

Drosophila kinetochore components Rough deal (Rod) and Zw10 are required for the proper functioning of the metaphase checkpoint in flies. The eukaryotic spindle assembly checkpoint (SAC) monitors microtubule attachment to kinetochores and prevents anaphase onset until all kinetochores are aligned on the metaphase plate. It is an essential surveillance mechanism that ensures high fidelity chromosome segregation during mitosis. In higher eukaryotes, cytoplasmic dynein is involved in silencing the SAC by removing the checkpoint proteins Mad2 and the Rod-Zw10-Zwilch complex (RZZ) from aligned kinetochores.

== Interactions ==
ZW10 has been shown to interact with RINT1 and dynamitin.
