= Checkerboard score =

In biodiversity studies, the checkerboard score or C-score is a statistic which determines the randomness of the distribution of two or more species through a collection of biomes. The statistic, first published by Stone and Roberts in 1990, expands on the earlier work of Diamond that defined a notion of "checkerboard distributions" as an indicator of species competition.

A low c-score indicates higher randomness, i.e. a greater likelihood that the distribution of one species has not been directly affected by the presence of other species.

== Definition and calculation ==
Given two species sp_{1}, sp_{2} and n islands, an incidence matrix is built. In the $2 \times n$ incident matrix, each row represents one of the two species and each column represents a different island. The matrix is then filled with each cell being set to either 0 or 1. Cell with the value of 0 means that a given species doesn't exist in the given island whilst the value of 1 means that the species does exist in the given island.

The calculation of the co-occurrence of two species sp_{1}, sp_{2} in the given set of islands is done as follows:

$$C_{ij} = (r_i- S_{ij}) (r_j - S_{ij} )$$

C_{ij} - C-score for the two species sp_{1}, sp_{2} in the given set of islands
S_{ij} - The number of co-occurrences of sp_{1}, sp_{2}
r_{i} - Number of islands in which sp_{1} has 1
r_{j} - Number of islands in which sp_{2} has 1

The checkerboard score (c-score) for the colonisation pattern is then calculated as the mean number of checkerboard units per species-pair in the community:

For M species, there are P = M(M-1)/2 species-pairs, so C-score is calculated:

$$C =\sum_{j=0}^{M} \sum_{i<j}C_{ij} / P$$

The C-score is sensitive to the proportion of islands that are occupied, thereby confounding comparisons between matrices or sets of species pairs within them. An extension of the C-score therefore standardizes by the number of islands each species-pair occupies using:

$$C_{ij} = (r_i- S_{ij}) (r_j - S_{ij} )/(r_i + r_j - S_{ij})$$
