= Zinc finger bed-type containing 5 =

Protein-coding gene in the species Homo sapiens

ZBED5

Identifiers
- Aliases: ZBED5, Buster1, zinc finger BED-type containing 5
- External IDs: OMIM: 615251; MGI: 1919220; GeneCards: ZBED5

Gene location (Human)
Chr.	Chromosome 11 (human)
Band	11p15.4	Start	10,812,074 bp
Band	11p15.4	End	10,858,796 bp

Gene location (Mouse)
Chr.	Chromosome 5 (mouse)
Band	5|5 G1.3	Start	129,924,564 bp
Band	5|5 G1.3	End	129,932,464 bp
RNA expression pattern
Bgee	Human / Mouse (ortholog); Top expressed in: tibia; epithelium of nasopharynx; ganglionic eminence; hair follicle; left ovary; skin of thigh; body of uterus; germinal epithelium; ventricular zone; right ovary / Top expressed in: Gonadal ridge; otic vesicle; zygote; oocyte; secondary oocyte; spermatocyte; primary oocyte; medial ganglionic eminence; cumulus cell; embryo; More reference expression data
BioGPS	n/a
Gene ontology
Molecular function	metal ion binding; DNA binding; DNA-binding transcription factor activity, RNA polymerase II-specific
Cellular component	nucleoplasm; cytoplasm
Biological process	regulation of transcription by RNA polymerase II
Sources:Amigo / QuickGO
Orthologs
Databases	NCBI: entry; OMA: entry
Species	Human	Mouse
Entrez	58486	71970
Ensembl	ENSG00000236287	ENSMUSG00000034173
UniProt	Q49AG3	n/a
RefSeq (mRNA)	NM_021211; NM_001143667	NM_183088; NM_001359408
RefSeq (protein)	NP_001137139; NP_067034	n/a
Location (UCSC)	Chr 11: 10.81 – 10.86 Mb	Chr 5: 129.92 – 129.93 Mb
PubMed search
- Wikidata
View/Edit Human	View/Edit Mouse

Zinc finger BED-type containing 5 is a protein that in humans is encoded by the ZBED5 gene.

== Function ==
This gene is unusual in that its coding sequence is mostly derived from Charlie-like DNA transposon; however, it does not appear to be an active DNA transposon as it is not flanked by terminal inverted repeats. The encoded protein is conserved among the mammalian Laurasiatheria branch. Multiple alternatively spliced variants, encoding the same protein, have been identified.

== See also ==
- BED zinc finger
