= ZBED8L =

Protein-coding gene in the species Homo sapiens

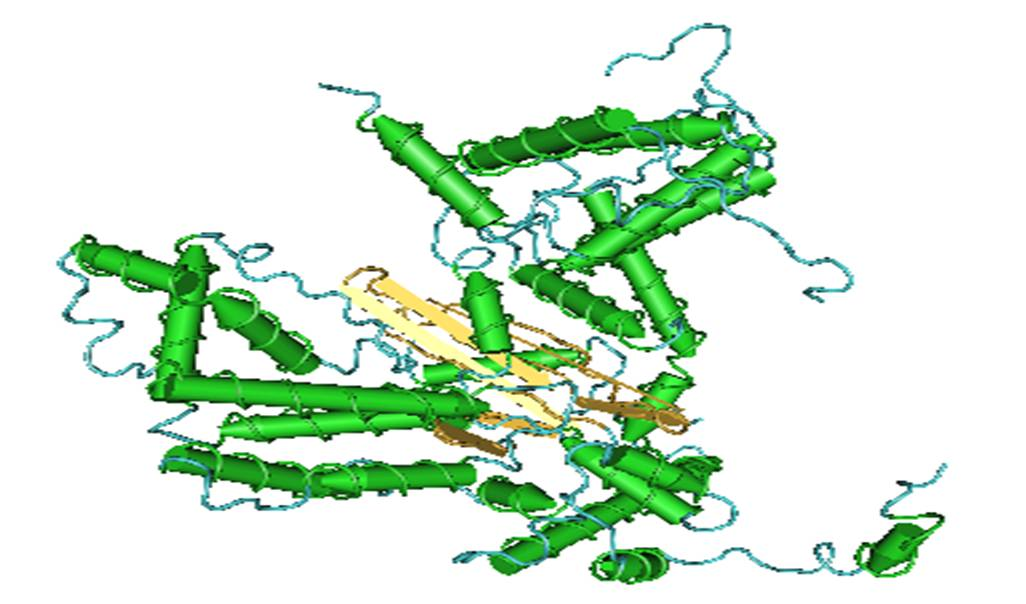

Identifiers
- Aliases: ZBED8L, C7orf38, family with sequence similarity 200 member A, FAM200A, ZBED8 like
- External IDs: GeneCards: ZBED8L

Gene location (Human)
Chr.	Chromosome 7 (human)
Band	7q22.1	Start	99,546,300 bp
Band	7q22.1	End	99,558,536 bp
RNA expression pattern
Bgee	Human / Mouse (ortholog); Top expressed in: gonad; ganglionic eminence; ventricular zone; Achilles tendon; islet of Langerhans; right testis; muscle of thigh; cerebellar hemisphere; stromal cell of endometrium; left ovary / n/a; More reference expression data
BioGPS	n/a
Gene ontology
Molecular function	protein binding; DNA-binding transcription factor activity, RNA polymerase II-specific; DNA binding
Cellular component	integral component of membrane; membrane; cytoplasm; nucleoplasm
Biological process	regulation of transcription by RNA polymerase II
Sources:Amigo / QuickGO
Orthologs
Databases	NCBI: entry; OMA: entry
Species	Human	Mouse
Entrez	221786	n/a
Ensembl	ENSG00000221909	n/a
UniProt	Q8TCP9	n/a
RefSeq (mRNA)	NM_145111	n/a
RefSeq (protein)	NP_659802	n/a
Location (UCSC)	Chr 7: 99.55 – 99.56 Mb	n/a
PubMed search		n/a
- Wikidata
View/Edit Human

C7orf38 is a gene located on chromosome 7 in the human genome. The gene is expressed in nearly all tissue types at very low levels. Evolutionarily, it can be found throughout the kingdom animalia. While the function of the protein is not fully understood by the scientific community, bioinformatic tools have shown that the protein bares much similarity to zinc finger or transposase proteins. Many of its orthologs, paralogs, and neighboring genes have been shown to possess zinc finger domains. The protein contains a hAT dimerization domain nears its C-terminus. This domain is highly conserved in transposase enzymes.

== Gene ==
C7orf38 is located on chromosome 7 at q22.1. Its genomic sequence contains 5,612 bp. The predominant transcript contains two exons and is 2,507 bp in length. The translated protein contains 573 amino acids.

== Protein composition ==
The 573 amino acid protein has a molecular weight of 66,280.05. The isoelectric point was found to occur at a pH of 5.775, about 1.6 pH lower than that of the average human pH. Two deviations from prototypical human proteins are evident. The protein contains a less than expected number of glycine residues, and is rich in leucine residues. There are not sections of strong hydrophobicity or hydrophilicity. Thus, it is not predicted to be a transmembrane protein.

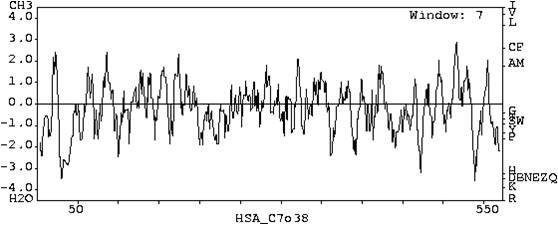

== Gene neighborhood ==
The four genes in closest proximity to C7orf38 on chromosome 7 exhibit similar function, many of which are transcription factors.

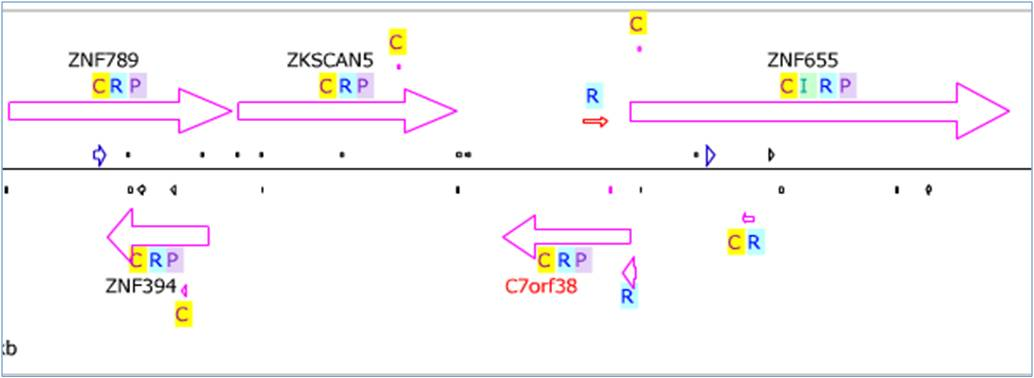

Name	Orientation	Function
ZNF789	Start: 98,908,451 bp from pter End: 98,923,153 bp from pter Size: 14,703 bases Orientation: plus strand	The gene encodes the zinc finger protein 789. Functionally, the gene has been proposed to participate in regulation of transcription. It is expected to use zinc ion binding.
ZNF394	Start: 98,928,790 bp from pter End: 98,935,813 bp from pter Size: 7,024 bases Orientation : minus strand	The gene encodes zinc finger protein 394. Over expression over ZNF394 inhibits the transchription of c-jun and Ap-1. Suggesting that it is a transcriptional repressor.
ZKSCAN5	Start: 98,940,209 bp from pter End: 98,969,381 bp from pter Size: 29,173 bases Orientation: plus strand	The gene encodes zinc finger with KRAB and SCAN domains 5. This gene encodes a zinc finger protein of the Kruppel family. The protein contains a SCAN box and a KRAB A domain.
ZNF655	Start: 98,993,981 bp from pter End: 99,012,012 bp from pter Size: 18,032 bases Orientation: plus strand	The gene encodes zinc finger protein 655. Numerous alternatively spliced transcripts encoding distinct isoforms have been discovered.
Mihuya	Start: 99,149,738 bp from pter End: 99,149,626 bp from pter Size: 112 bases Orientation: plus strand	The Mihuya gene does not encode a large or known functional protein. The antisense relationship to C7orf38 raises the possibility for regulation of expression.

== Paralogs ==
Eight paralogs are found in the human proteome. Similar to the neighboring genes, many of the paralogs function as zinc fingers, or transcription factors.

Name	NCBI Accession Number	Length (AA)	% Identity to C7orf38	% Similarity to C7orf38
hypothetical protein LOC285550	NP_001138663.1	657	79	91
zinc finger MYM-type protein 6	NP_009098.3	1325	38	60
SCAN domain-containing protein 3	NP_443155.1	1325	39	60
zinc finger BED domain-containing protein 5	NP_067034.2	692	35	57
transposon-derived Buster3 transposase-like	NP_071373.2	594	32	53
general transcription factor II-I repeat domain-containing protein 2B	NP_001003795.1	949	25	46
GTF2I repeat domain containing 2	NP_775808.2	949	24	45
EPM2A interacting protein 1	NP_055620.1	607	22	42

== Orthologs ==
Orthologs to C7orf38 can be traced back evolutionarily through plants. The following is not an extensive list of orthologs. It is intended to provide an evolutionary overview of the conservation of C7orf38.

Common name	Genus & species	NCBI accession number	Length (AA)	% Identity to C7orf38	% Similarity to C7orf38
Chimp	Pan troglodytes	XP_001139775.1	573	99	99
Macaque monkey	Macaca fascicularis	BAE01234.1	573	96	98
Horse	Equus caballus	XP_001915370.1	573	81	84
Pig	Sus scrofa	XP_001929194	1323	39	61
Cow	Bos taurus	XP_875656.2	1320	38	61
Mouse	Mus musculus	CAM15594.1	1157	37	60
Domestic dog	Canis lupus familiaris	ABF22701.1	609	37	60
Rat	Rattus rattus	NP_001102151.1	1249	37	59
Opossum	Monodelphis domestica	XP_001372983.1	608	37	59
Chicken	Gallus gallus	XP_424913.2	641	37	58
Frog	Xenopus (Silurana) tropicalis	ABF20551.1	656	37	56
Zebra fish	Danio rerio	XP_001340213.1	609	37	56
Pea aphid	Acyrthosiphon pisum	XP_001943527.1	659	36	54
Beatle	Tribolium castaneum	ABF20545.1	599	35	55
Sea squirt	Ciona intestinalis	XP_002119512.1	524	34	52
Hydra	Hydra magnipapillata	XP_002165429.1	572	29	52
Puffer fish	Tetraodon nigroviridis	CAF95678.1	539	28	47
Mosquito	Anopheles gambiae	XP_558399.5	591	28	47
Sea urchin	Strongylocentrotus purpuratus	ABF20546.1	625	27	47
Grass plant	Sorghum bicolor	XP_002439156.1	524	25	40
Broad leaf tree	Populus trichocarpa	XP_002319808.1	788	21	39

== Structure ==
=== Protein ===
CBLast was used to determine a structurally related protein with experimentally determined structure. The protein Hermes DNA transposase, of the Hermes DBD superfamily, was shown to be structurally similar (Evalue: 1E-6).

hAT Dimerization Domain

Identifiers
- Symbol: hAT
- Pfam: PF05699
- InterPro: IPR008906
Available protein structures:
- PDB: IPR008906 PF05699 (ECOD; PDBsum)
- AlphaFold: IPR008906; PF05699

The hAT dimerization domain is found at the C-terminus of transposase elements belonging to the Activator superfamily (hAT element superfamily). The isolated dimerization domain forms extremely stable dimers in vitro.

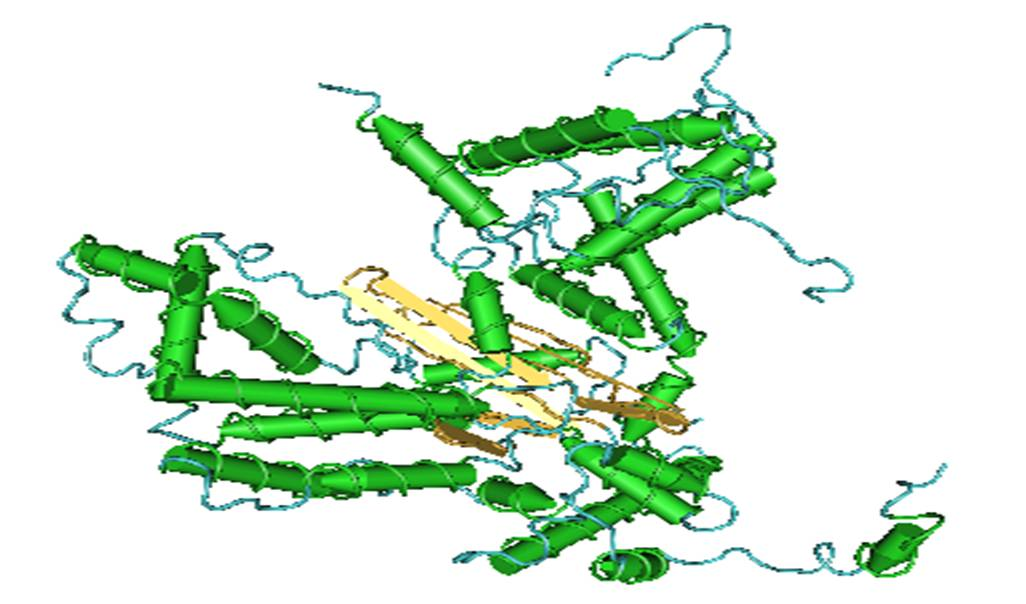

=== mRNA ===
The MFOLD program available at Rensselaer BioInformatics Server was used to predict secondary structure of the mature mRNA sequence. The primary sequence of the mRNA secondary structures displayed high levels of conservation in orthologs, suggesting structural importance.

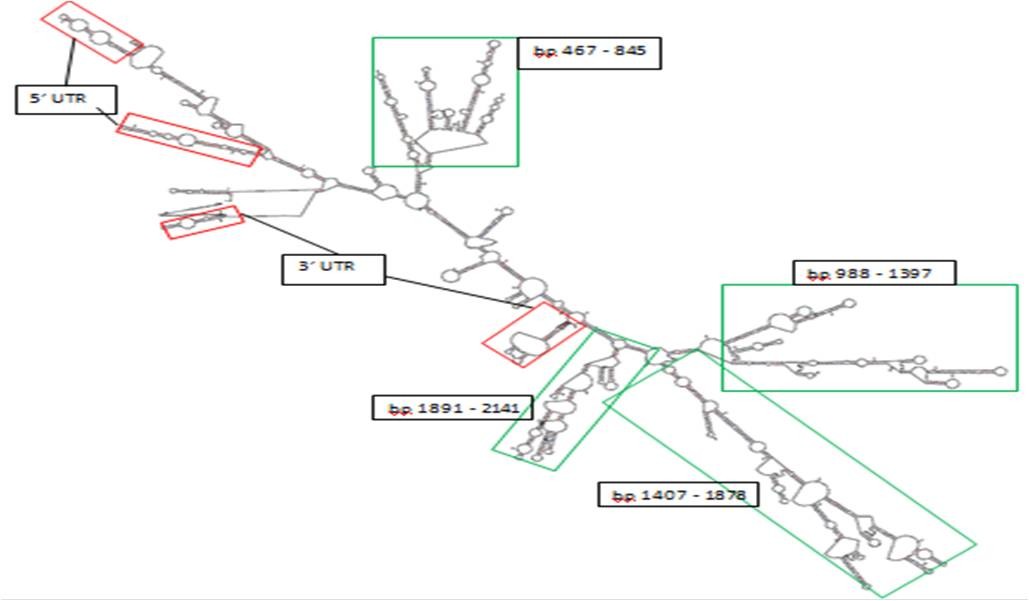

== Tissue distribution ==
The gene appears to be expressed in most tissue types. Very low levels of expression were observed through est profiles, and no deviation was observed between health or developmental states.

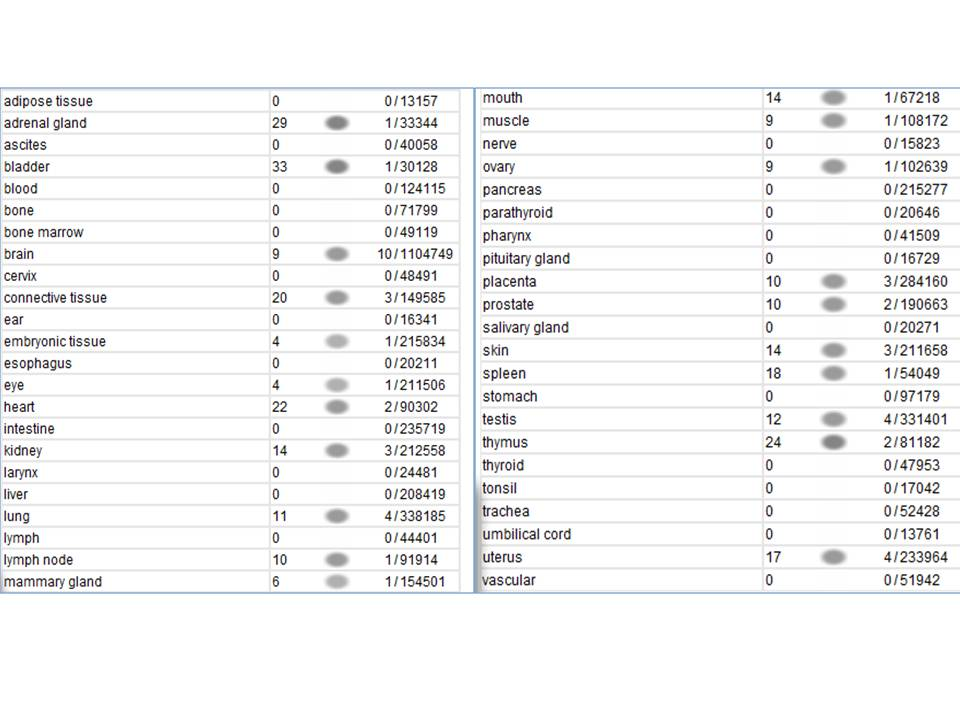

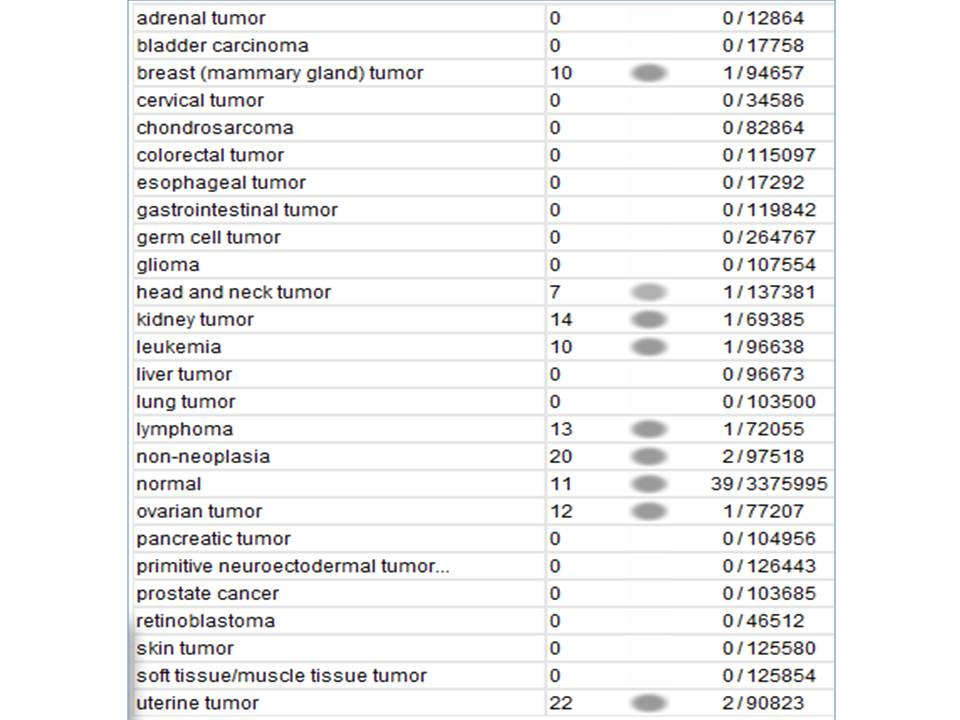

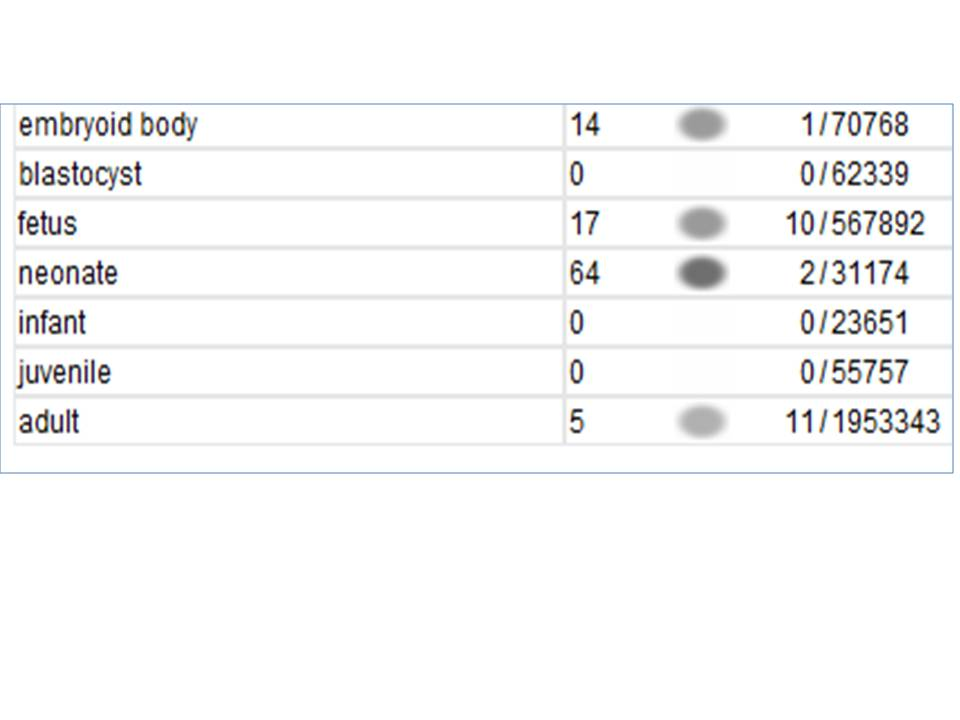
