= RINT1 =

Protein-coding gene in the species Homo sapiens

Identifiers
- Aliases: RINT1, RINT-1, RAD50 interactor 1, ILFS3
- External IDs: OMIM: 610089; MGI: 1916233; GeneCards: RINT1

Gene location (Human)
Chr.	Chromosome 7 (human)
Band	7q22.3	Start	105,532,169 bp
Band	7q22.3	End	105,567,677 bp

Gene location (Mouse)
Chr.	Chromosome 5 (mouse)
Band	5|5 A3	Start	23,992,709 bp
Band	5|5 A3	End	24,025,367 bp
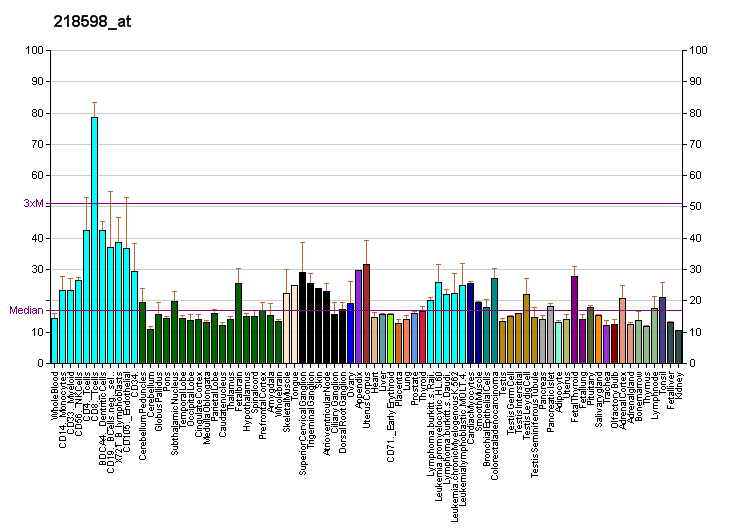
RNA expression pattern
Bgee	Human / Mouse (ortholog); Top expressed in: tibia; testicle; body of pancreas; muscle of thigh; gastrocnemius muscle; right uterine tube; Achilles tendon; skin of abdomen; skin of leg; cerebellar hemisphere / Top expressed in: Rostral migratory stream; spermatocyte; tail of embryo; islet of Langerhans; fossa; right kidney; esophagus; genital tubercle; stomach; neural tube; More reference expression data
BioGPS	More reference expression data
Gene ontology
Molecular function	protein binding
Cellular component	cytoplasm; Dsl1/NZR complex; endoplasmic reticulum membrane; endoplasmic reticulum; membrane; cytosol
Biological process	protein transport; cell cycle; regulation of ER to Golgi vesicle-mediated transport; Golgi vesicle transport; vesicle-mediated transport; retrograde vesicle-mediated transport, Golgi to endoplasmic reticulum; Golgi organization
Sources:Amigo / QuickGO
Orthologs
Databases	NCBI: entry; OMA: entry
Species	Human	Mouse
Entrez	60561	72772
Ensembl	ENSG00000135249	ENSMUSG00000028999
UniProt	Q6NUQ1	Q8BZ36
RefSeq (mRNA)	NM_021930; NM_001346599; NM_001346600; NM_001346601; NM_001346603	NM_177323; NM_001310467
RefSeq (protein)	NP_001333528; NP_001333529; NP_001333530; NP_001333532; NP_068749	NP_001297396; NP_796297
Location (UCSC)	Chr 7: 105.53 – 105.57 Mb	Chr 5: 23.99 – 24.03 Mb
PubMed search
- Wikidata
View/Edit Human	View/Edit Mouse

RAD50-interacting protein 1 is a protein that in humans is encoded by the RINT1 gene.

== Interactions ==
RINT1 has been shown to interact with Rad50 and ZW10.
