= HAT transposon =

hAT transposons are a superfamily of DNA transposons, or Class II transposable elements, that are common in the genomes of plants, animals, and fungi.

== Nomenclature and classification ==
Superfamilies are identified by shared DNA sequence and ability to respond to the same transposase. Common features of hAT transposons include a size of 2.5-5 kilobases with short terminal inverted repeats and short flanking target site duplications generated during the transposition process.

The hAT superfamily's name derives from three of its members: the hobo element from Drosophila melanogaster, the Activator or Ac element from Zea mays, and the Tam3 element from Antirrhinum majus. The superfamily has been divided based on bioinformatics analysis into at least two clusters defined by their phylogenetic relationships: the Ac family and the Buster family. More recently, a third group called Tip has been described.

== Family members ==
The hAT transposon superfamily includes the first transposon discovered, Ac from Zea mays (maize), first reported by Barbara McClintock. McClintock was awarded the Nobel Prize in Physiology or Medicine in 1983 for this discovery. The family also includes a subgroup known as space invaders or SPIN elements, which have very high copy numbers in some genomes and which are among the most efficient known transposons. Although no extant active example is known, laboratory-generated consensus sequences of active SPIN elements are able to generate high copy numbers when introduced to cells from a wide range of species.

== Distribution ==
hAT transposons are widely distributed across eukaryotic genomes, but are not active in all organisms. Inactive hAT transposon sequences are present in mammal genomes, including the human genome; they are among the transposon families believed to have been present in the ancestral vertebrate genome. Among mammals, the genome of the little brown bat Myotis lucifugus is notable for its relatively high and recently acquired number of inactive hAT transposons.

The distribution of SPIN elements is patchy and does not relate well to known phylogenetic relationships, prompting suggestions that these elements may have spread through horizontal gene transfer.

== Domestication ==
Transposons are said to be exapted or "domesticated" when they have acquired functional roles in the host genome. Several sequences evolutionarily related to the hAT family have been exapted in diverse organisms, including Homo sapiens. An example is the ZBED gene family, which encode a group of zinc finger-containing regulatory proteins.
