= Medical Science Monitor =

- Discipline: Medicine
- Language: English
- Edited by: Richard M. Kream

Publication details
- History: 1995–present
- Publisher: International Scientific Information
- Impact factor: 1.433 (2014)

Standard abbreviations
- ISO 4: Med. Sci. Monit.

Indexing
- CODEN: MSMOFR
- ISSN: 1234-1010 (print); 1643-3750 (web)
- OCLC no.: 427662735

Links
- Journal homepage; Online access

The Medical Science Monitor: International Medical Journal of Experimental and Clinical Research is a peer-reviewed general medical journal. It was established in 1995 in Poland and has been published by International Scientific Information based in Melville, New York, U.S.A. since 2002. It was published in both print and online formats until 2012, at which point the journal became online-only. The editor-in-chief is Richard M. Kream. According to the Journal Citation Reports, the journal has a 2019 impact factor of 1.918. Medical Science Monitor is indexed in JCR Clarivate, PubMed, PubMed PMC, EMBASE, and Scopus, which provide abstracts and indexing for publications in established medical journals.
