= TP53I3 =

Protein-coding gene in the species Homo sapiens

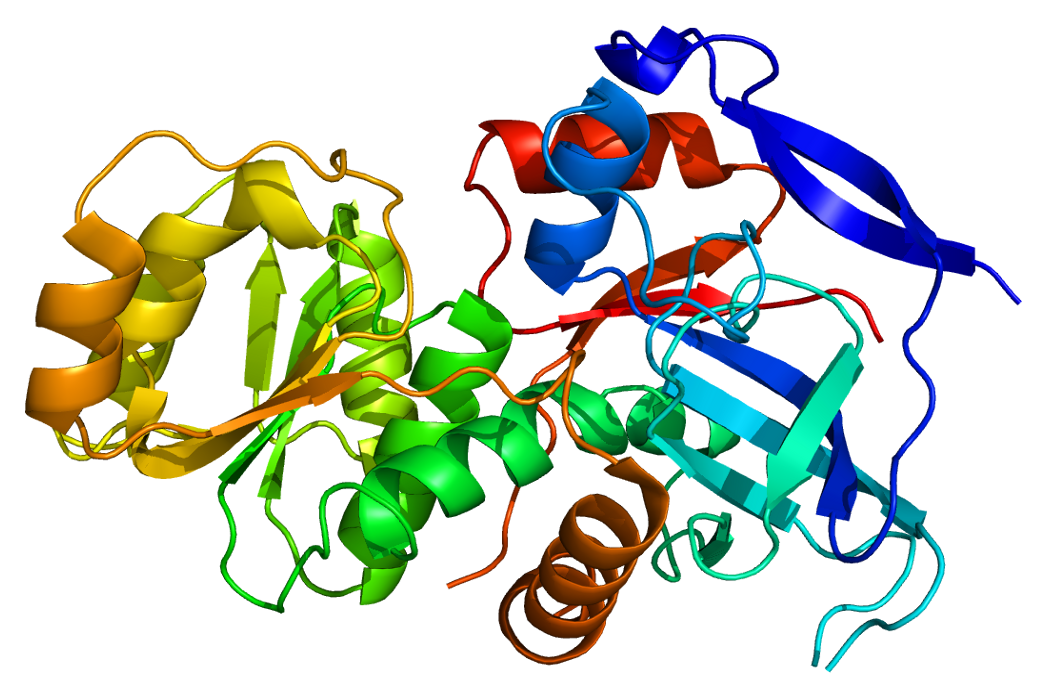
Available structures
PDB	Human UniProt search: PDBe RCSB
PDB	List of PDB id codes 2J8Z, 2OBY

Identifiers
- Aliases: TP53I3, PIG3, tumor protein p53 inducible protein 3
- External IDs: OMIM: 605171; HomoloGene: 36617; GeneCards: TP53I3; OMA:TP53I3 - orthologs

Gene location (Human)
Chr.	Chromosome 2 (human)
Band	2p23.3	Start	24,077,433 bp
Band	2p23.3	End	24,085,861 bp
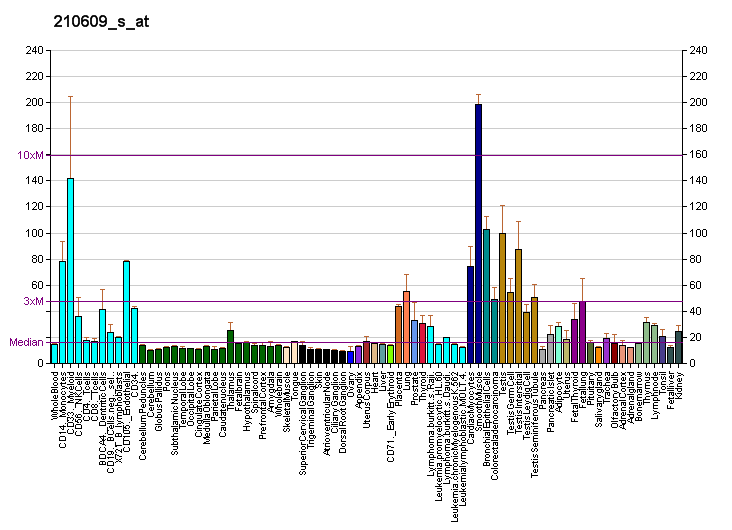
RNA expression pattern
Bgee	Human / Mouse (ortholog); Top expressed in: mucosa of ileum; pancreatic ductal cell; mucosa of transverse colon; duodenum; rectum; body of pancreas; vagina; left testis; gallbladder; upper lobe of left lung / n/a; More reference expression data
BioGPS	More reference expression data
Gene ontology
Molecular function	oxidoreductase activity; protein homodimerization activity; NADPH binding; quinone binding; NADPH:quinone reductase activity
Cellular component	cytosol
Biological process	NADP metabolic process; regulation of apoptotic process
Sources:Amigo / QuickGO
Orthologs
Species	Human	Mouse
Entrez	9540	n/a
Ensembl	ENSG00000115129	n/a
UniProt	Q53FA7	n/a
RefSeq (mRNA)	NM_001206802; NM_004881; NM_147184	n/a
RefSeq (protein)	NP_001193731; NP_004872; NP_671713	n/a
Location (UCSC)	Chr 2: 24.08 – 24.09 Mb	n/a
PubMed search		n/a
- Wikidata
View/Edit Human

Putative quinone oxidoreductase is an enzyme that in humans is encoded by the TP53I3 gene.

The protein encoded by this gene is similar to oxidoreductases, which are enzymes involved in cellular responses to oxidative stresses and irradiation. This gene is induced by the tumor suppressor p53 and is thought to be involved in p53-mediated cell death. It contains a p53 consensus binding site in its promoter region and a downstream pentanucleotide microsatellite sequence. P53 has been shown to transcriptionally activate this gene by interacting with the downstream pentanucleotide microsatellite sequence. The microsatellite is polymorphic, with a varying number of pentanucleotide repeats directly correlated with the extent of transcriptional activation by p53. It has been suggested that the microsatellite polymorphism may be associated with differential susceptibility to cancer. At least two transcript variants encoding the same protein have been found for this gene.
