= Golgi matrix =

The Golgi matrix is a collection of proteins involved in the structure and function of the Golgi apparatus. The matrix was first isolated in 1994 as an amorphous collection of 12 proteins that remained associated together in the presence of detergent (which removed Golgi membranes) and 150 mM NaCl (which removed weakly associated proteins). Treatment with a protease enzyme removed the matrix, which confirmed the importance of proteins for the matrix structure. Modern freeze etch electron microscopy (EM) clearly shows a mesh connecting Golgi cisternae and associated vesicles. Further support for the existence of a matrix comes from EM images showing that ribosomes are excluded from regions between and near Golgi cisternae.

The Golgin GMAP210 has functional regions at both ends.

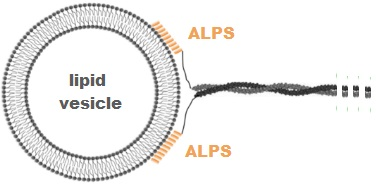
The ALPS of GMAP210 binds to curved, but not flat, lipid layers

== Structure and function ==
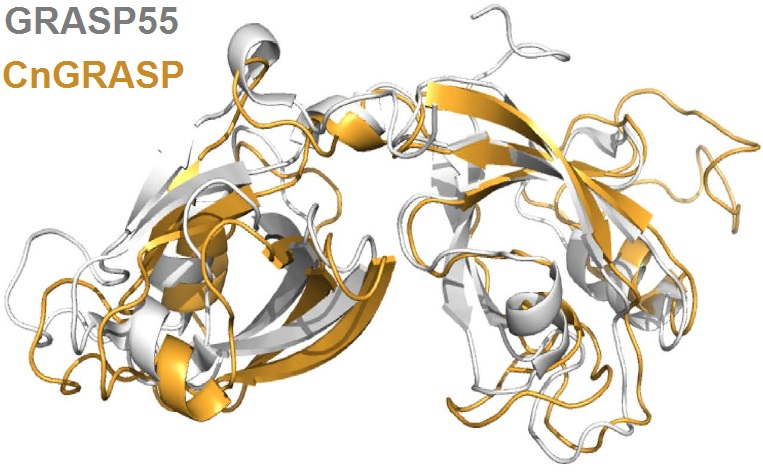
GRASP domain alignment of GRASP55 and the GRASP homologue of Cryptococcus neoformans

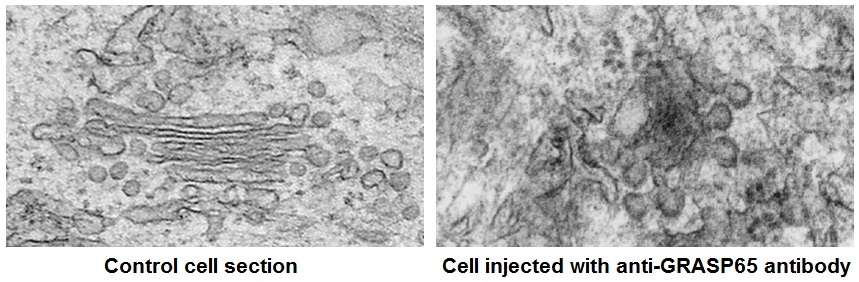
Microinjection of antibodies to GRASP65 prevents normal Golgi stack formation.

The first individual protein component of the matrix was identified in 1995 as Golgin A2 (then called GM130). Since then, many other golgin family proteins have been found to be in the Golgi matrix and are associated with the Golgi membranes in a variety of ways. For example, GMAP210 (Golgi Microtubule Associated Protein 210) has an ALPS (Amphipathic Lipid-Packing Sensor) motif in the N-termal 38 amino acids and an ARF1-binding domain called GRAB (Grip-Related Arf-Binding) at the C-terminus. Thus, the GRAB-domain can bind indirectly to Golgi cisternae and its ALPS motif can tether vesicles. Golgins have coiled-coil domains and are thus predicted to have elongated structures up to 200 nm in length. Most are peripheral membrane proteins attached at one end to Golgi membranes. They have flexible regions between the coiled-coil domains, which make them ideal candidates for mediating the dynamic vesicle docking to Golgi cisternae and dynamic structure of the Golgi itself.

Golgi reassembly-stacking proteins are an evolutionarily conserved family of proteins in the Golgi matrix. GRASP65 and GRASP55 are the 2 human GRASPs. These proteins were named from their requirement for accurate Golgi reassembly during an in vitro assay, but they have also been shown to function in vivo, as shown in the accompanying figure. GRASPs associate with lipid bilayers because they are myristoylated and their myristic acid residue intercalates into the lipid layer. Their trans oligomerization is controlled by phosphorylation and is thought to explain the fragmentation of the Golgi as required during mitosis.

== Components ==
- Bicaudal D homolog
- CASP
- CG-NAP
- COH1
- GCC88
- GCC185
- GCP60
- Giantin
- GMAP210
- Golgin A2
- Golgin A7
- Golgin 45
- Golgin 67 and the product of duplicated gene GOLGA8A
- Golgin 84
- Golgin 97
- Golgin 160
- Golgin 245
- GORAB
- GRASP55
- GRASP65
- JAKMIP2
- JAKMIP3
- TMF1
- USO1

== Disease associations ==
- CG-NAP hereditary Long QT syndrome LQT11
- COH1 Cohen Syndrome
- GMAP210 Achondrogenesis type IA
- Golgin A2 a complex, neuromuscular disorder
- GORAB Gerodermia osteodysplastica
