= Helical growth =

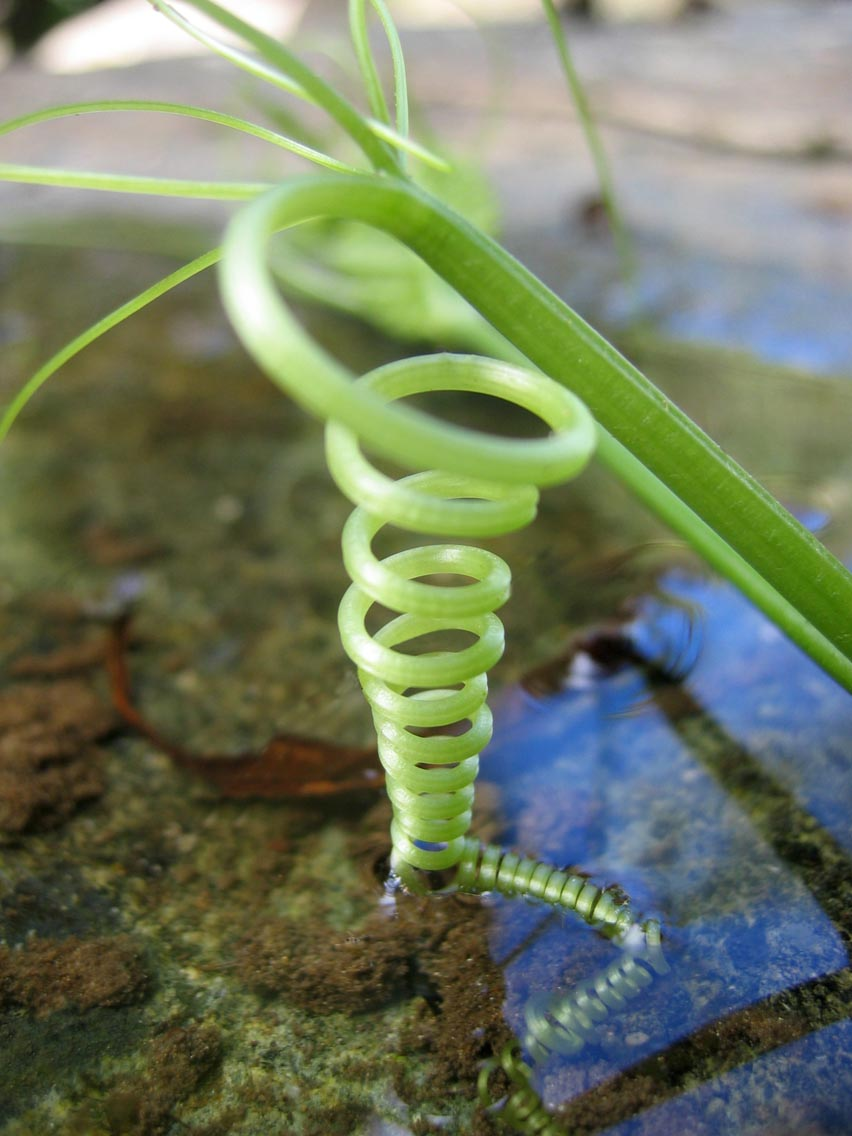
A natural left-handed helix seen in a tendril of a climber plant. Tendrils often show helix reversals.

Helical growth is a type of plant development where cells or organs expand, resulting in helical shaped cells or organs and typically including the breakage of symmetry. This is seen in fungi, algae, and other higher plant cells or organs. Helical growth can occur naturally, such as in tendrils or in twining plants. Asymmetry can be caused by changes in pectin or through mutation and result in left- or right-handed helices. Tendril perversion, during which a tendril curves in opposite directions at each end, is seen in many cases. The helical growth of twining plants is based on the circumnutational movement, or circular growth, of stems. Most twining plans have right-handed helices regardless of the plant's growth hemisphere.

Helical growth in single cells, such as the fungi genus Phycomyces or the algae genus Nitella, is thought to be caused by a helical arrangement of structural biological material in the cell wall. In mutant thale cress, helical growth is seen at the organ level. Analysis strongly suggests that cortical microtubules have an important role in controlling the direction of organ expansion. It is unclear how helical growth mutations affect thale cress cell wall assembly.

When seen in spiral3, a conserved GRIP1 gene, a missense mutation causes a left-handed helical organization of cortical microtubules and a severe right-hand helical growth. This mutation compromises interactions between proteins GCP2 and GCP3 in yeast. While the efficiency of microtubule dynamics and nucleation were not noticeably affected, cortical microtubule angles were less narrow and more widely distributed.
