= CED9 =

CED9 may be:

- CED9 (gene), a notable gene
- Taltheilei Narrows Water Aerodrome, CED9 ICAO airport code
