= Ced-3 =

Protein-coding gene in the species Caenorhabditis elegans

CED-3

Identifiers
- Organism: Caenorhabditis elegans
- Symbol: CED-3
- Entrez: 178272
- Orthologs: NCBI: entry; OMA: entry
- RefSeq (mRNA): NM_001268779.1.
- RefSeq (Prot): NP_001255708.1.
- UniProt: P42573

Other data
- Chromosome: IV: 13.2 - 13.2 Mb
Search for
- Structures: Swiss-model
- Domains: InterPro

Ced-3 is one of the major protein components of the programmed cell death (PCD) pathway for Caenorhabditis elegans. There are in total 14 genes that are involved in programmed cell death, other important ones including ced-4 and ced-9 genes. The healthy nematode worm will require 131 somatic cell deaths out of the 1090 cells during the developmental stages. The gene initially encodes for a prototypical caspase (procaspase) where the active cysteine residue cleaves aspartate residues, thus becoming a functional caspase. Ced-3 is an executioner caspase (cysteine-dependent aspartate-directed protease) that must dimerize with itself and be initiated by ced-4 in order to become active. Once active, it will have a series of reactions that will ultimately lead to the apoptosis of targeted cells.

Programmed cell death in C. elegans will occur in the embryonic and post-embryonic stages in both somatic and germ line cells. During embryogenesis is when the ced-3 transcript is at its highest peak due to the numerous cells that need to undergo cell suicide. Most programmed cell deaths occur in the brain tissue of the C. elegans where the majority of cells targeted for cell death have lineages from neuronal and glial cells. From there, ced-3 is localized to perinuclear regions of the cells.

In order for ced-3 to become functional, it requires auto-catalytic cleavage which is initiated by ced-4, acting as an initiator caspase. Ced-3 gene is found downstream of ced-4 and positively regulates ced-3. It can also be indirectly inhibited by ced-9 and prevent apoptosis by inhibiting the function of ced-4 thus inhibiting the function of ced-3.

The ced-3 ortholog in humans is caspase 9, an interleukin-1β converting enzyme (ICE) and the ortholog in mice was found to be the Nedd-2 gene.

== History ==
In 1986, the two researchers, Hilary Ellis and H. Robert Horvitz discovered that ced-3 and ced-4 genes were somehow involved in the apoptosis.

Later on, in 2002, Sydney Brenner, H. Robert Horvitz, and John E. Sulston were awarded the 2002 Nobel Prize in Physiology or Medicine for their research in programmed cell death They were able to visualize the process of PCD using differential interference contrast (DIC) microscopy.

During their research, Ellis, performed various experiments mutating the ced-3 gene and found that the cells encoding the mutated ced-3 gene all survived even though they were originally targeted for cell death. This led to the discovery of the ced-3 protein and its role in PCD; prior to the experiment, ced-3 was first thought to act as a repressor for the ced-1 gene. Ced-1 and ced-2 were the first ced genes to be initially discovered in 1983.

In order for biologists to learn about PCD, they needed a model organism and this was first introduced by Sydney Brenner in 1974 with the nematode, C. elegans. This organism would serve as the subject of research for many years, leading to other biological discoveries, not only for C. elegans but for mammals as well.

== Function ==
One of the main roles of the ced-3 protein in C. elegans is to help the development and growth of the organism. Without apoptosis, the cells that have been damaged or aged will not be able to be replaced with newer, healthier cells thus inducing growth. Targeted cells are fated to die at certain times and places during development which showed it is all part of a developmental plan. These cells once had a function that was necessary to the growth of the organism but later becomes useless and are targeted for elimination. Some other roles of programmed cell death include tissue homeostasis and disease prevention. If a cell is transformed or if its DNA has been damaged then the cell must be degraded before further damage can be done.

In a recent study, it was found that for C. elegans in particular, programmed cell death is also found to be related to an immune system response to a pathogenic infection. By eliminating the infected cells, the nematode can ensure its survival against the attack. C. elegans also undergoes major anatomy changes that must be mediated by programmed cell deaths, and it was found that PCD is regulated by environmental conditions due to the fact that cell deaths were more commonly found in old, starving worms rather than new, healthy worms.

=== Ced-3 during apoptosis ===
During the process of apoptosis, the cell undergoes:

- DNA fragmentation
- Nucleus fragmentation
- Disruption of cytoskeletal proteins
- Golgi matrix protein fragmentation
- Phagocytosis of neighbouring cells
- Cytoplasm shrinkage

As a wild-type protein, ced-3 will cleave other protein substrates within the cell and trigger apoptosis. In the nucleus, ced-3 cleaves DCR-1, so that the RNA can no longer be processed, and then it converts RNase into DNase thus promoting DNA degradation in the nucleus and mitochondrial elimination in the cytoplasm. Afterwards, ced-3 indirectly releases another protein, WAH-1, that can cause signals on the surface of the cell to be released so that the cell can be phagocytosed by a neighbouring cell.

== Structure ==
In C. elegans, the ced-3 gene is found on chromosome 4 with an exon count of 8 and it is a protein expressed gene. The gene encodes for a caspase; more specifically, a cysteine-aspartate protease The gene is described as a "Cell death protein 3" and it is an ortholog to the mammalian version of the gene, caspase 9. Its name is derived from the term "cell death".

Structurally, ced-3 has two protein domains:

- CARD domain (Caspase recruitment domain)
- Caspase domain

CARD domains have protein-protein interactions where the CARD domain of both ced-3 and ced-4 are able to have homophilic interactions with each other. The caspase domain is the main domain of the protein, where the cleavage activity of the protease takes place. The active protease contains a large and small subunit where the large subunit is 17kDa and the small subunit is 15kDa in weight.

Ced-3 consists of 2 isoforms, isoform a and isoform b. Isoform a has a transcript length of 2437 nucleotide (nt), 1512 nt coding sequence, and a 503 amino acid (aa) protein length. Isoform b has 864 nt transcript length, 864 nt coding sequence, and 287 aa protein length. The middle regions of the amino acid sequence is rich in serine residues, but these regions are not conserved for the ICE proteins in humans. Instead, the carboxy-terminal regions of the proteins are the most well conserved in both humans and mice.

== Mechanism ==
Ced-3 genes are highly expressed in the mother of daughter cells that are targeted to die. The procaspase ced-3 gene produced in mother cells gets inherited to daughter cells where they are translated and activated.

When the ced-3 gene is translated into a protein, it is first made into a precursor protein that needs to undergo modifications in order to become an active caspase. First, the active cysteine recognizes specific sequences containing aspartate and cleaves the aspartate which causes the C-terminal domain and the central polypeptides to heterodimerize to form the protease. This process is an autocatalytic process, meaning that the ced-3 protein cleaves itself in order to become functional. The remaining N-terminal domain is now called the prodomain and it is a part of the CARD domain but it is not a part of the cleaved protease. The prodomain gets recognized by ced-4 and consequently initiates ced-3 processing. Prior to this, apoptosis must be triggered by the increased gene expression of another protein known as the "death receptor", called EGL-1 protein. EGL-1 will then bind to and inhibit ced-9 which is an inhibitor caspase that recognizes and binds to ced-4 so that it can no longer activate ced-3. This causes a failure in apoptosis and the cell would continue live. These 4 proteins, including ced-3, are considered to make up the core apoptotic machinery which can also be found in orthologs of mammals.

Once the ced-3 caspase is activated, the same cysteine residue of the protease goes and recognizes the amino acid aspartate, in other proteins, effectively cleaving them. These proteins are found in the nucleus, nuclear lamina, cytoskeleton, endoplasmic reticulum, and cytosol. The action of cleaving certain proteins instigate a series of pathways leading to the degradation of the cell.

== Significance ==
Ced-3 is a critical part of the programmed cell death pathway which is a well known pathway for being associated with cancer, autoimmune diseases, and neurodegenerative diseases in mammals. The discovery of the ced-3 function and mutations in C. elegans led to the understanding of how programmed cell death works in mammals. The C.elegans provided as a model organism that allowed researchers to compare the ortholog genes in the programmed cell death pathway. The ortholog of ced-3 gene is caspase 9 and its mutated form is involved in the origin of certain cancers and tumourous tissues. A mutation in the caspase gene can either cause the protein to be non-functional thereby allowing the cells to live and accumulate in the tissue or cause a DNA damaged protein to live and disrupt the body for further harm. This occurs commonly in the brain, leading to neurodevelopmental or neurodegenerative diseases.

=== Mutations ===
Various experiments were performed on C. elegans to determine the function of ced-3. Most of these experiments involved mutating the ced-3 gene and seeing how that affected the worm's development overall. With the loss of function mutations in the ced-3 gene, it was found that the somatic cells that were programmed to die were instead found alive. With missense mutations in the ced-3 gene, there was a decrease in ced-3 activation by ced-4 indicating that the prodomain was affected. A deletion mutation in the protease region of ced-3 also caused a decrease in the effectiveness of cell death activity. Then finally, with gain of function mutations, the worm was found with extra cells that were dead from the normal 131 cells.

== Interactions ==
Ced-3 has been shown to interact with:

- ced-4
- ced-9
- EGL-1 (BH3)
- ced-1
