= ARL1 =

Protein-coding gene in humans

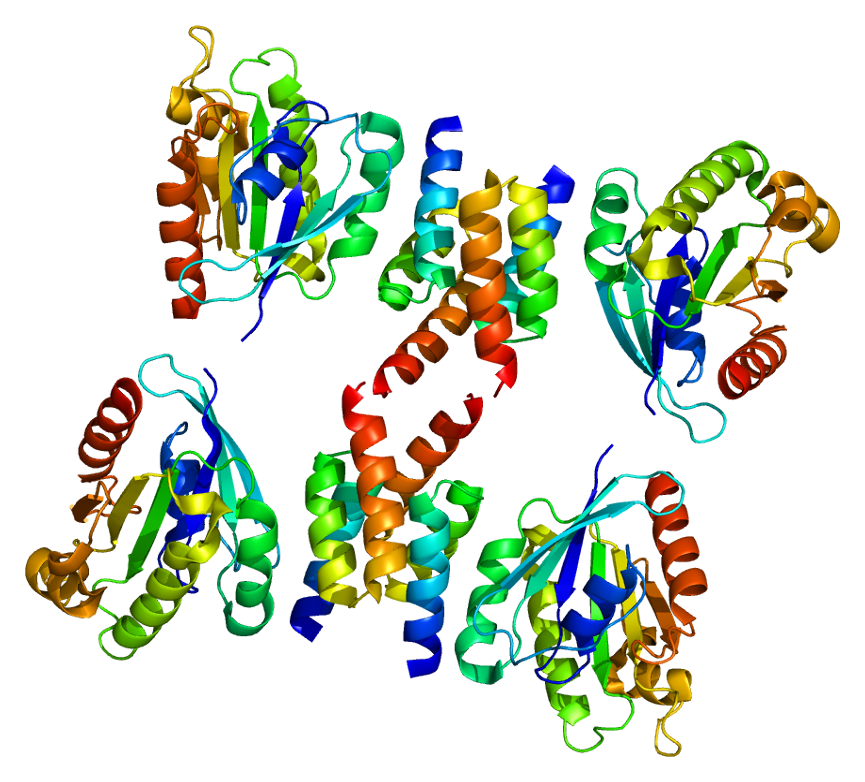

Identifiers
- Aliases: ARL1, ARFL1, ADP ribosylation factor like GTPase 1
- External IDs: OMIM: 603425; MGI: 99436; GeneCards: ARL1
Available structures
PDB	Ortholog search: PDBe RCSB
PDB	List of PDB id codes 1UPT, 4DCN, 5EE5

Gene location (Human)
Chr.	Chromosome 12 (human)
Band	12q23.2	Start	101,393,116 bp
Band	12q23.2	End	101,407,772 bp

Gene location (Mouse)
Chr.	Chromosome 10 (mouse)
Band	10|10 C1	Start	88,566,720 bp
Band	10|10 C1	End	88,579,956 bp
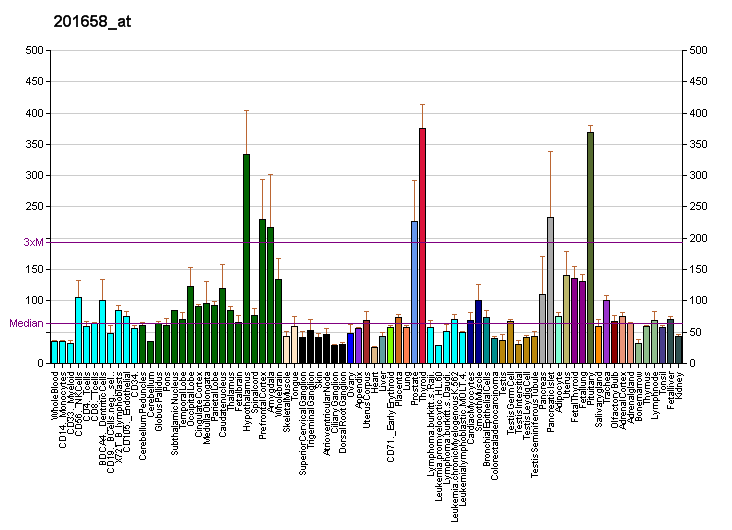

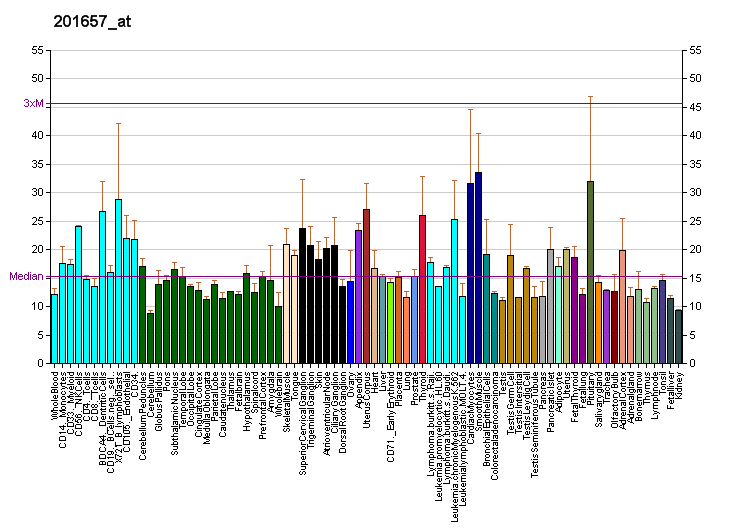

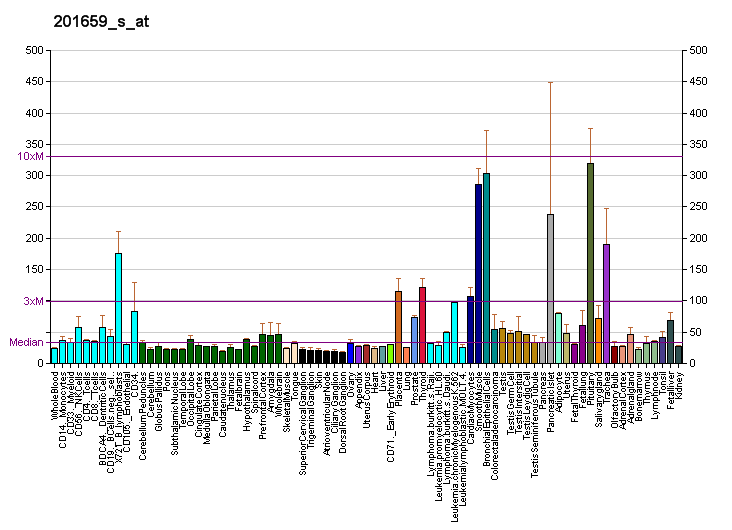
RNA expression pattern
Bgee	Human / Mouse (ortholog); Top expressed in: islet of Langerhans; stromal cell of endometrium; endothelial cell; Achilles tendon; Brodmann area 23; pons; saphenous vein; rectum; epithelium of colon; superior surface of tongue / Top expressed in: ileum; quadriceps femoris muscle; jejunum; proximal tubule; uterus; pancreas; muscle of thigh; stomach; ovary; duodenum; More reference expression data
BioGPS	More reference expression data
Gene ontology
Molecular function	nucleotide binding; enzyme activator activity; GTPase activity; protein domain specific binding; metal ion binding; GTP binding
Cellular component	Golgi apparatus; Golgi membrane; intracellular anatomical structure; membrane; cytoplasm; trans-Golgi network; trans-Golgi network membrane; cytosol
Biological process	protein localization to Golgi apparatus; toxin metabolic process; activation of phospholipase D activity; retrograde transport, endosome to Golgi; Golgi organization; Golgi vesicle transport; intracellular protein transport; vesicle-mediated transport
Sources:Amigo / QuickGO
Orthologs
Databases	NCBI: entry; OMA: entry
Species	Human	Mouse
Entrez	400	104303
Ensembl	ENSG00000120805	ENSMUSG00000060904
UniProt	P40616	P61211
RefSeq (mRNA)	NM_001301068; NM_001177	NM_025859
RefSeq (protein)	NP_001168; NP_001287997	NP_080135
Location (UCSC)	Chr 12: 101.39 – 101.41 Mb	Chr 10: 88.57 – 88.58 Mb
PubMed search
- Wikidata
View/Edit Human	View/Edit Mouse

ADP-ribosylation factor-like protein 1 is a protein that in humans is encoded by the ARL1 gene.

== Function ==
The protein encoded by this gene belongs to the ARL (ADP-ribosylation factor-like) family of proteins, which are structurally related to ADP-ribosylation factors (ARFs). ARFs, described as activators of cholera toxin (CT) ADP-ribosyltransferase activity, regulate intracellular vesicular membrane trafficking, and stimulate a phospholipase D (PLD) isoform. Although, ARL proteins were initially thought not to activate CT or PLD, later work showed that they are weak stimulators of PLD and CT in a phospholipid dependent manner.

== Interactions ==
ARL1 has been shown to interact with GOLGA4 and GOLGA1.
