= GCC2 =

Protein-coding gene in the species Homo sapiens

Identifiers
- Aliases: GCC2, GCC185, RANBP2L4, REN53, GRIP and coiled-coil domain containing 2
- External IDs: OMIM: 612711; MGI: 1917547; GeneCards: GCC2
Available structures
PDB	Ortholog search: PDBe RCSB
PDB	List of PDB id codes 3BBP

Gene location (Human)
Chr.	Chromosome 2 (human)
Band	2q12.3	Start	108,449,107 bp
Band	2q12.3	End	108,509,415 bp
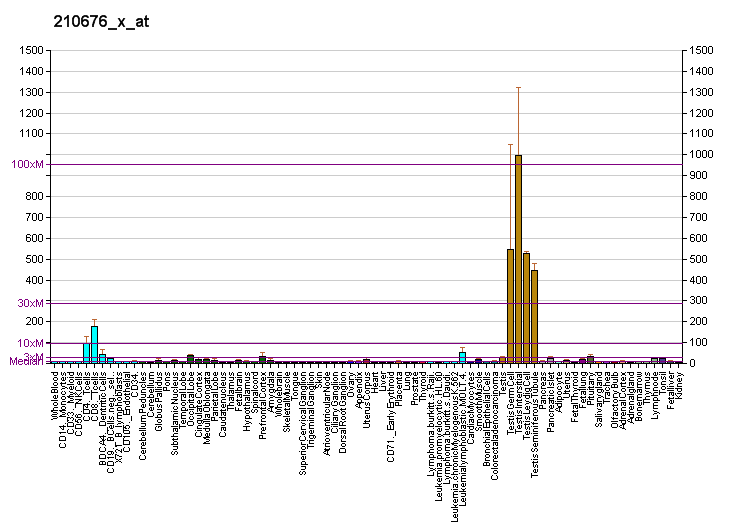

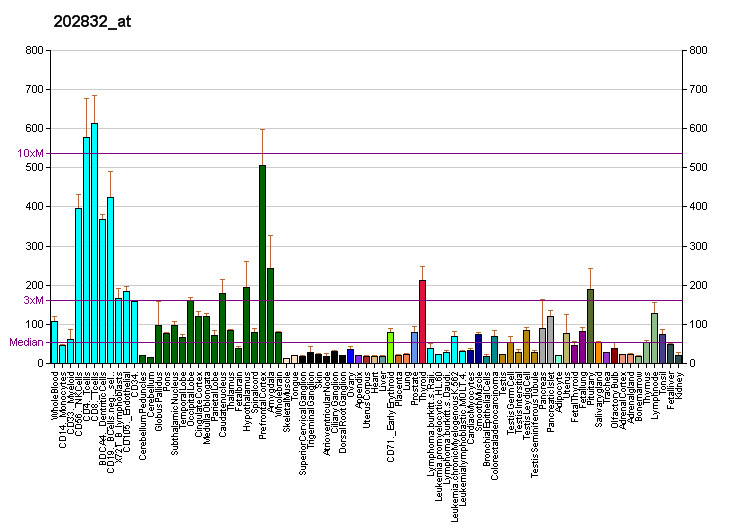

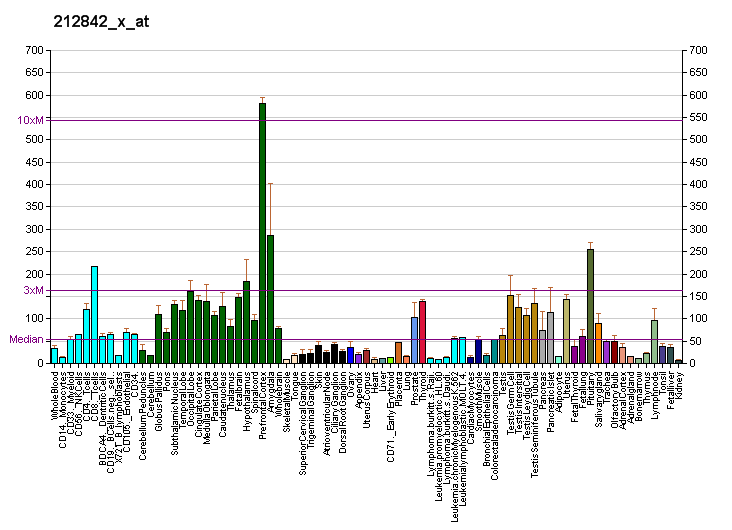
RNA expression pattern
Bgee	Human / Mouse (ortholog); Top expressed in: Achilles tendon; corpus epididymis; testicle; epithelium of colon; bronchial epithelial cell; jejunal mucosa; Epithelium of choroid plexus; caput epididymis; Brodmann area 23; endothelial cell / n/a; More reference expression data
BioGPS	More reference expression data
Gene ontology
Molecular function	protein binding; identical protein binding
Cellular component	cytoplasm; trans-Golgi network; Golgi apparatus; membrane; cytosol; nucleoplasm
Biological process	Golgi to plasma membrane protein transport; protein transport; microtubule anchoring; protein targeting to lysosome; retrograde transport, endosome to Golgi; late endosome to Golgi transport; regulation of protein exit from endoplasmic reticulum; microtubule organizing center organization; recycling endosome to Golgi transport; Golgi ribbon formation; protein localization to Golgi apparatus; transport
Sources:Amigo / QuickGO
Orthologs
Databases	NCBI: entry; OMA: entry
Species	Human	Mouse
Entrez	9648	70297
Ensembl	ENSG00000135968	ENSMUSG00000038039
UniProt	Q8IWJ2	Q8CHG3
RefSeq (mRNA)	NM_181453	NM_027375
RefSeq (protein)	NP_852118	n/a
Location (UCSC)	Chr 2: 108.45 – 108.51 Mb	n/a
PubMed search
- Wikidata
View/Edit Human	View/Edit Mouse

GRIP and coiled-coil domain-containing protein 2 is a protein that in humans is encoded by the GCC2 gene.

The protein encoded by this gene is a peripheral membrane protein localized to the trans-Golgi network. It is sensitive to brefeldin A. This encoded protein contains a GRIP domain which is thought to be used in targeting. Two alternatively spliced transcript variants encoding different isoforms have been described for this gene.
