= TRIM29 =

Protein in humans

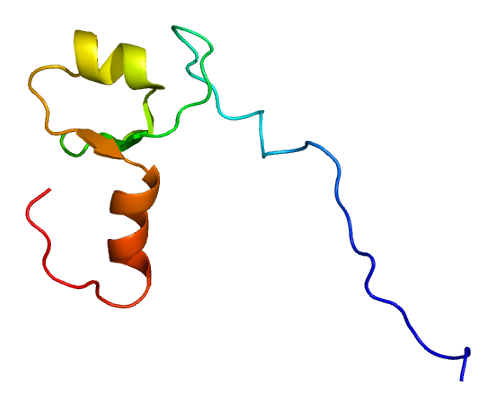

Identifiers
- Aliases: TRIM29, ATDC, tripartite motif containing 29
- External IDs: OMIM: 610658; MGI: 1919419; GeneCards: TRIM29
Available structures
| PDB | Ortholog search: PDBe RCSB |
| PDB | List of PDB id codes 2CSV |

Gene location (Human)
| Chr. | Chromosome 11 (human) |
| Band | 11q23.3 | Start | 120,111,286 bp |
| Band | 11q23.3 | End | 120,185,529 bp |

Gene location (Mouse)
| Chr. | Chromosome 9 (mouse) |
| Band | 9|9 A5.1 | Start | 43,222,145 bp |
| Band | 9|9 A5.1 | End | 43,247,412 bp |
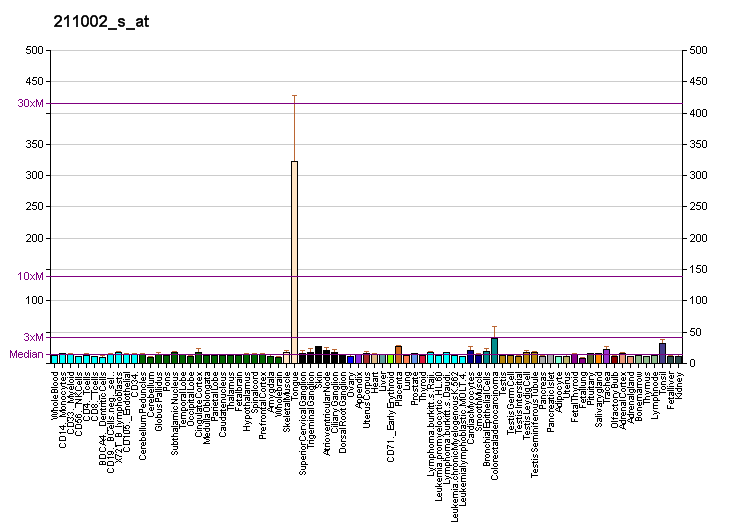

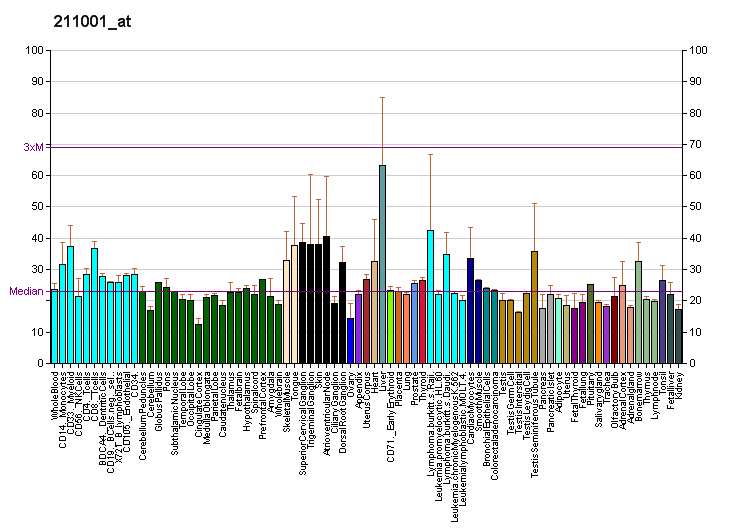

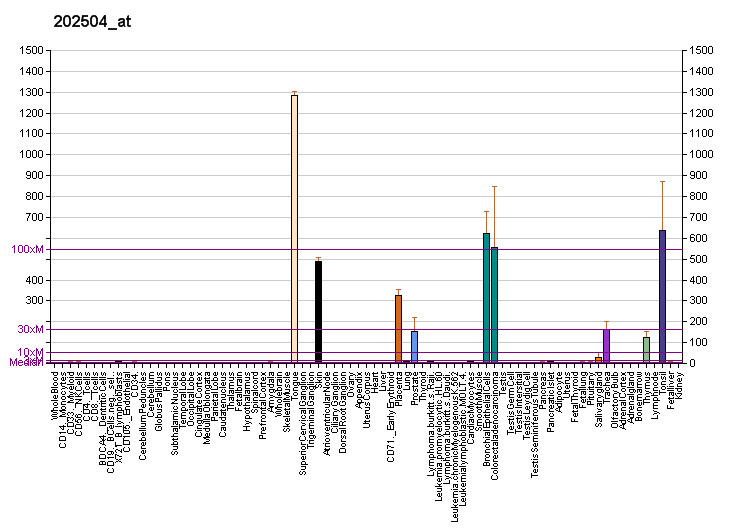
RNA expression pattern
| Bgee | Human / Mouse (ortholog); Top expressed in: skin of thigh; gums; gingival epithelium; mucosa of pharynx; skin of arm; skin of abdomen; vulva; human penis; nipple; oral cavity / Top expressed in: lip; skin of external ear; esophagus; epidermis; skin of abdomen; skin of back; hair follicle; conjunctival fornix; cornea; middle ear; More reference expression data |
| BioGPS | More reference expression data |
Gene ontology
| Molecular function | DNA-binding transcription factor activity; zinc ion binding; p53 binding; protein binding; metal ion binding; cadherin binding involved in cell-cell adhesion; identical protein binding |
| Cellular component | intracellular anatomical structure; cytoplasm; lysosome |
| Biological process | negative regulation of protein localization to nucleus; negative regulation of transcription by RNA polymerase II; transcription by RNA polymerase II; cell-cell adhesion; immune system process; innate immune response |
Sources:Amigo / QuickGO
Orthologs
| Databases | NCBI: entry; OMA: entry |
| Species | Human | Mouse |
| Entrez | 23650 | 72169 |
| Ensembl | ENSG00000137699 | ENSMUSG00000032013 |
| UniProt | Q14134 | Q8R2Q0 |
| RefSeq (mRNA) | NM_012101; NM_058193; NM_001330382 | NM_023655 |
| RefSeq (protein) | NP_001317311; NP_036233 | NP_076144 |
| Location (UCSC) | Chr 11: 120.11 – 120.19 Mb | Chr 9: 43.22 – 43.25 Mb |
| PubMed search |
- Wikidata
| View/Edit Human | View/Edit Mouse |

Tripartite motif-containing protein 29 is a protein that in humans is encoded by the TRIM29 gene.

== Function ==
The protein encoded by this gene belongs to the TRIM protein family. It has multiple zinc finger motifs and a leucine zipper motif. It has been proposed to form homo- or heterodimers which are involved in nucleic acid binding. Thus, it may act as a transcriptional regulatory factor involved in carcinogenesis and/or differentiation. It may also function in the suppression of radiosensitivity since it is associated with ataxia–telangiectasia phenotype.

== Interactions ==
TRIM29 has been shown to interact with TRIM23 and GCC1.
