= Tendril perversion =

Tendency of a coil to split into two or more parts of opposite chirality

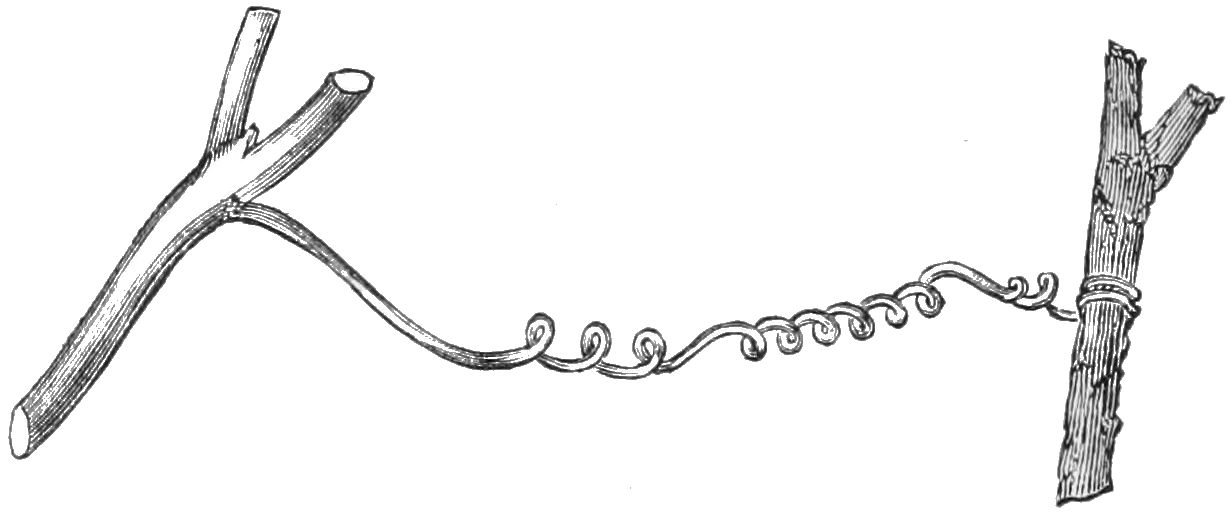
A tendril of Bryonia dioica exhibiting tendril perversion

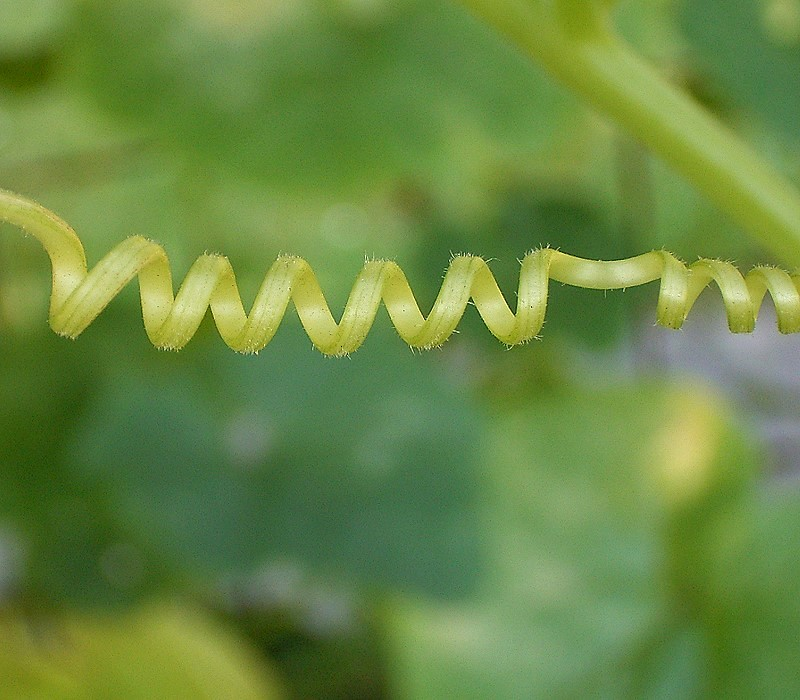
Cucurbita pepo exhibiting tendril perversion

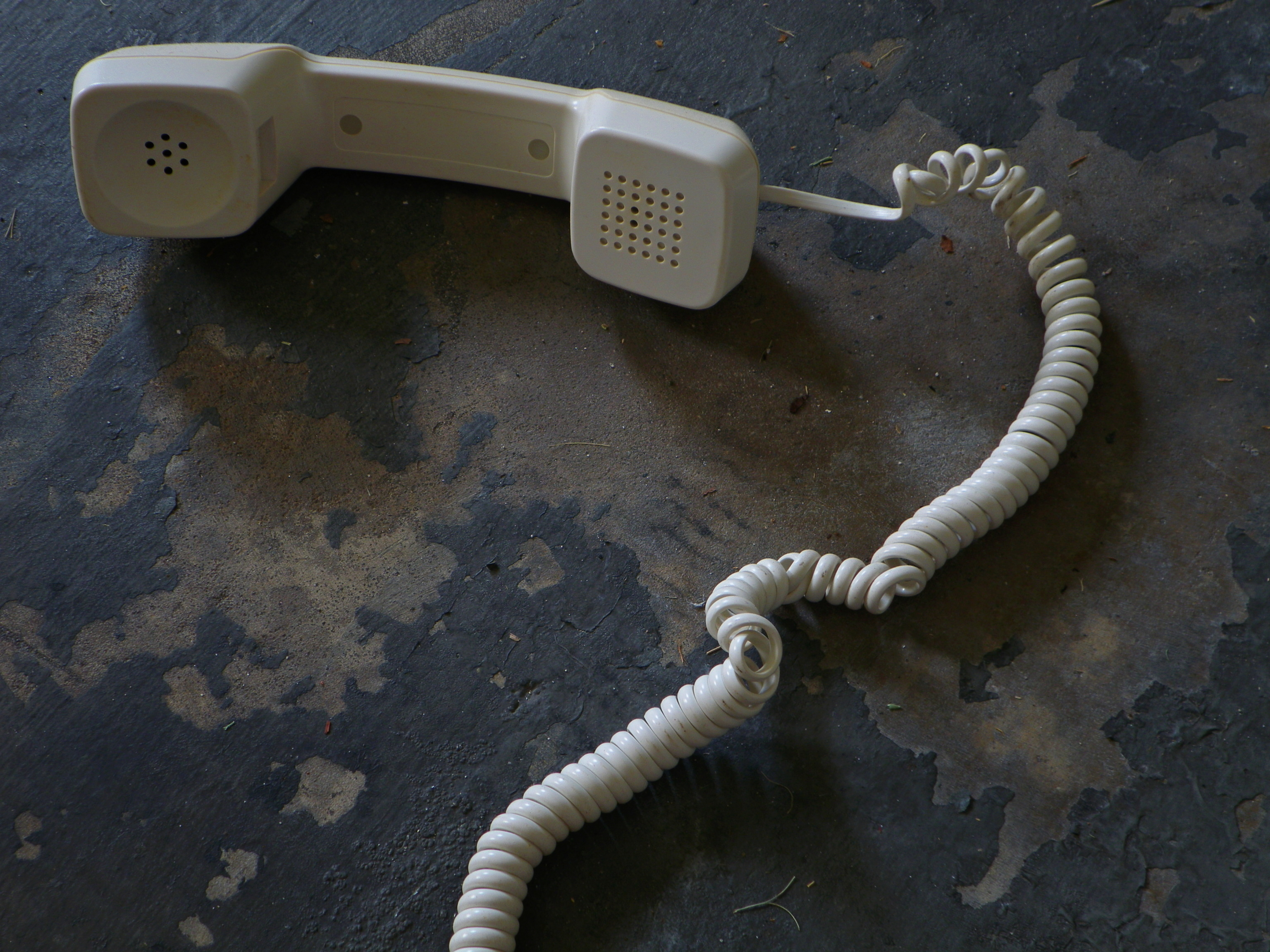
A telephone handset cord exhibiting tendril perversion

GIF video showing two different types of tendril perversion

Tendril perversion is a geometric phenomenon sometimes observed in helical structures in which the direction of the helix transitions between left-handed and right-handed. Such a reversal of chirality is commonly seen in helical plant tendrils and telephone handset cords.

The phenomenon was known to Charles Darwin, who wrote in 1865,

A tendril ... invariably becomes twisted in one part in one direction, and in another part in the opposite direction ... This curious and symmetrical structure has been noticed by several botanists, but has not been sufficiently explained.

The term "tendril perversion" was coined by Alain Goriely and Michael Tabor in 1998 based on the word perversion found in 19th-century science literature. "Perversion" is a transition from one chirality to another and was known to James Clerk Maxwell, who attributed it to topologist J. B. Listing.

Tendril perversion can be viewed as an example of spontaneous symmetry breaking, in which the strained structure of the tendril adopts a configuration of minimum energy while preserving zero overall twist.

Tendril perversion has been studied both experimentally and theoretically. Gerbode et al. have made experimental studies of the coiling of cucumber tendrils. A detailed study of a simple model of the physics of tendril perversion was made by McMillen and Goriely in the early 2000s. Liu et al. showed in 2014 that "the transition from a helical to a hemihelical shape, as well as the number of perversions, depends on the height to width ratio of the strip's cross-section."

Generalized tendril perversions were put forward by Silva et al., to include perversions that can be intrinsically produced in elastic filaments, leading to a multiplicity of geometries and dynamical properties.

== See also ==
- Helical growth
- Hemihelix
