= GORAB =

Protein-coding gene in humans

Identifiers
- Aliases: GORAB, GO, NTKLBP1, SCYL1BP1, golgin, RAB6 interacting
- External IDs: OMIM: 607983; MGI: 2138271; GeneCards: GORAB

Gene location (Human)
Chr.	Chromosome 1 (human)
Band	1q24.2	Start	170,531,819 bp
Band	1q24.2	End	170,553,834 bp

Gene location (Mouse)
Chr.	Chromosome 1 (mouse)
Band	1|1 H2.1	Start	163,212,477 bp
Band	1|1 H2.1	End	163,231,238 bp
RNA expression pattern
Bgee	Human / Mouse (ortholog); Top expressed in: Achilles tendon; rectum; endothelial cell; tibia; pancreatic epithelial cell; epithelium of nasopharynx; testicle; cartilage tissue; palpebral conjunctiva; gonad / Top expressed in: hand; calvaria; dermis; medial ganglionic eminence; genital tubercle; epithelium of lens; maxillary prominence; Gonadal ridge; otolith organ; vas deferens; More reference expression data
BioGPS	n/a
Gene ontology
Molecular function	protein binding
Cellular component	Golgi apparatus; nucleolus; nucleus; nucleoplasm; cytoplasm; cytosol
Biological process	hair follicle morphogenesis; positive regulation of smoothened signaling pathway involved in dorsal/ventral neural tube patterning; non-motile cilium assembly
Sources:Amigo / QuickGO
Orthologs
Databases	NCBI: entry; OMA: entry
Species	Human	Mouse
Entrez	92344	98376
Ensembl	ENSG00000120370	ENSMUSG00000040124
UniProt	Q5T7V8	Q8BRM2
RefSeq (mRNA)	NM_001146039; NM_152281; NM_001320252	NM_178883; NM_001313738
RefSeq (protein)	NP_001139511; NP_001307181; NP_689494	NP_001300667; NP_849214
Location (UCSC)	Chr 1: 170.53 – 170.55 Mb	Chr 1: 163.21 – 163.23 Mb
PubMed search
- Wikidata
View/Edit Human	View/Edit Mouse

RAB6-interacting golgin also known as N-terminal kinase-like-binding protein 1 (NTKL-BP1) or SCY1-like 1-binding protein 1 (SCYL1-BP1) is a protein that in humans is encoded by the GORAB gene.

== Function ==
This gene encodes a member of the golgin family, a group of coiled-coil proteins localized to the Golgi apparatus. The encoded protein may function in the secretory pathway. The encoded protein, which also localizes to the cytoplasm, was identified by interactions with the N-terminal kinase-like protein, and thus it may function in mitosis.

== Clinical significance ==
Mutations in this gene have been associated with geroderma osteodysplastica.

== See also ==
- Gerodermia osteodysplastica
