= Hemihelix =

Quasi-helical curved geometric shape

Animatic of a Rotating Hemihelix

Video recording for a hemihelix with one perversion under water. Both ends are free to rotate.

A hemihelix is a curved geometric shape consisting of a series of helices with alternating chirality, connected by a perversion at the reversals.

The formation of hemihelices with periodic distributions of perversions in slender structures is understood in terms of competing buckling instabilities generated by in-plane stresses.
