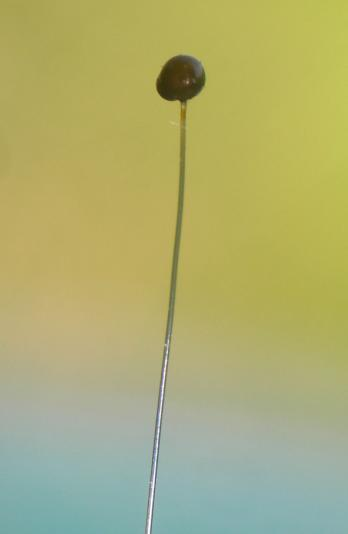
- Closeup of the Phycomyces sporangium

Scientific classification
- Kingdom: Fungi
- Division: Mucoromycota
- Class: Mucoromycetes
- Order: Mucorales
- Family: Phycomycetaceae
- Genus: Phycomyces; Kunze

Species
- Phycomyces blakesleeanus; Phycomyces nitens

= Phycomyces =

Genus of fungi

Phycomyces is a genus of fungus in the phylum Mucoromycota. They are known for their strong phototropism response and helical growth of the sporangium. The best studied species is Phycomyces blakesleeanus.

== Asexual reproduction ==
Phycomyces can reproduce via extension of mycelia, or by production of spores either asexually or sexually. The asexual cycle includes the formation of spore containing sporangia borne on the top of sporangiophores that may extend 10 to 15 cm above the surface of the fungal colony from which they emerged. The long filamentous sporangiophores respond to divergent environmental signals including light, gravity, wind, chemicals, and adjacent objects. The sporangia contain vegetative spores with one to six haploid nuclei. When these spores are dispersed, they can establish new colonies.

== Sexual reproduction ==
Phycomyces have two mating types that are indistinguishable morphologically. The sexual cycle is thought to occur by the following steps. Two hyphae of different mating type encounter each other, and their tips undergo a septation event to produce gametangia. Gametangia are haploid multinuclear cells equivalent to gametes. The two gametangia fuse to form an immature zygospore. Initially the developing zygospore contains thousands of nuclei contributed by the gametangia. During the course of zygospore maturation and dormancy, lasting several months, most nuclei are degraded. It is thought that ordinarily two surviving nuclei, one from each parent, fuse to form a diploid cell that then undergoes meiosis to form haploid meiotic products. These products then reproduce by mitotic divisions leading to the formation of a sporangium structure (germosporangium) that develops out from the zygospore. The germosporangium contains spores (germspores) that have one to six haploid nuclei like those in the vegetative sporangium.

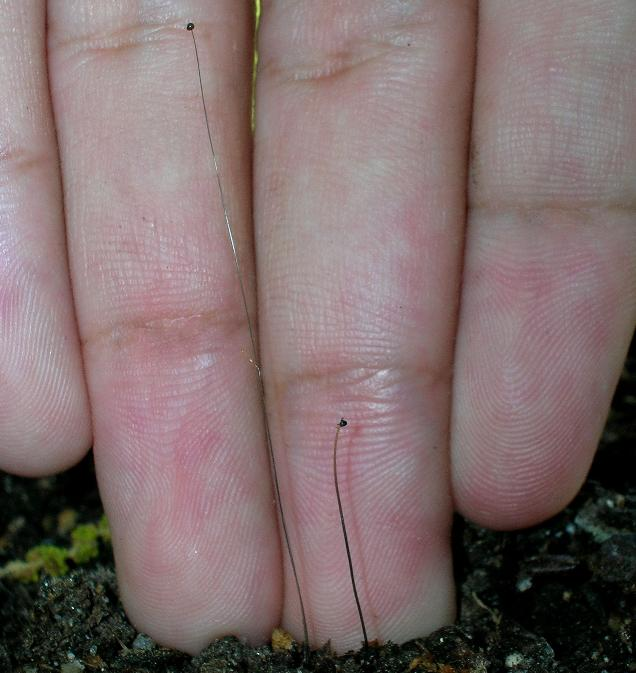
Phycomyces sporangium with fingers for size comparison

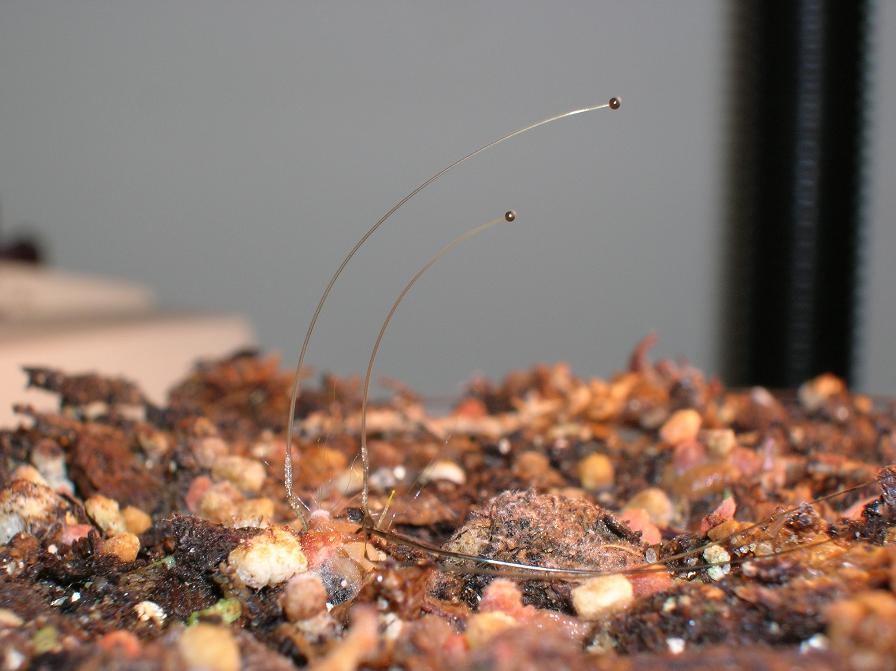
Phycomyces exhibiting strong phototropism

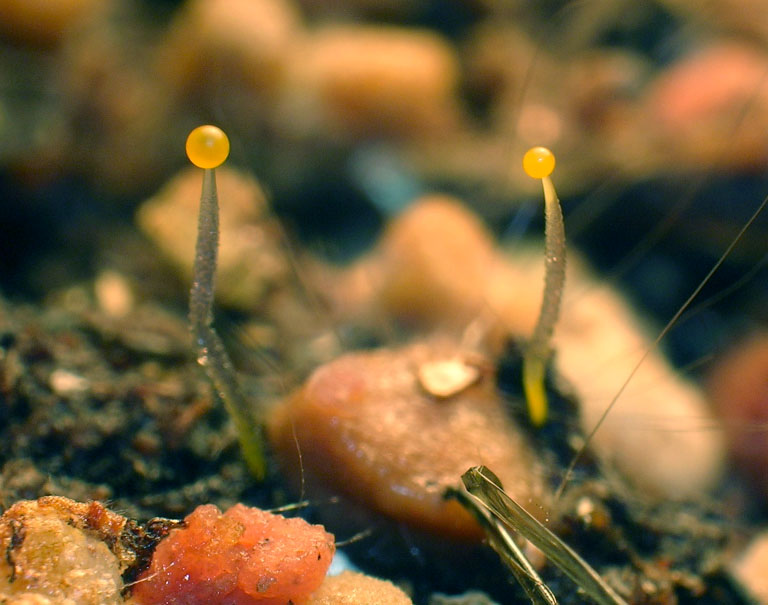
Newly emerged Phycomyces from a fish food pellet in potting soil
