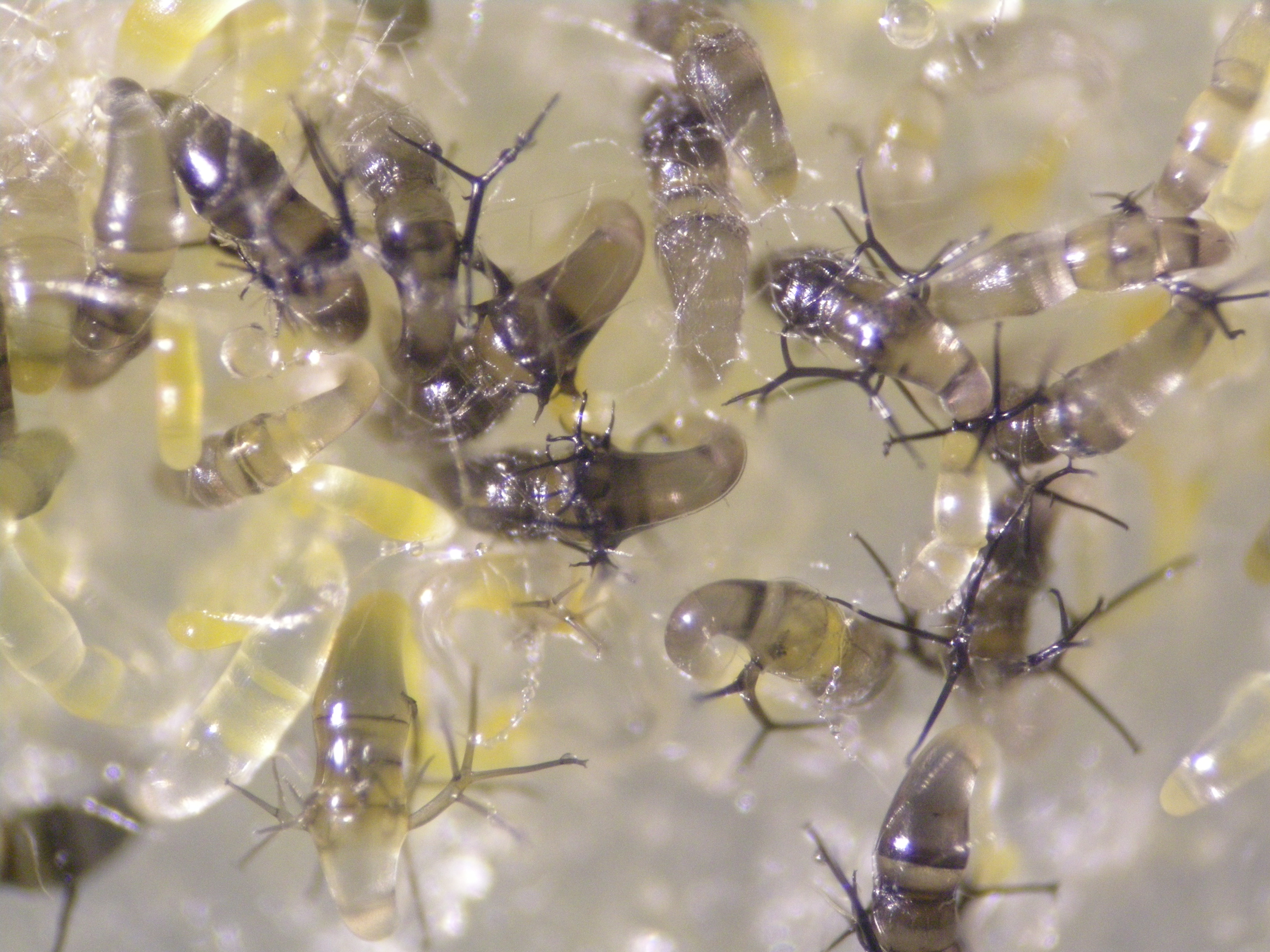
- Phycomyces blakesleeanus zygosporangia

Scientific classification
- Kingdom: Fungi
- Division: Mucoromycota
- Class: Mucoromycetes
- Order: Mucorales
- Family: Phycomycetaceae
- Genus: Phycomyces
- Species: P. blakesleeanus

Binomial name
- Phycomyces blakesleeanus Burgeff, 1925

= Phycomyces blakesleeanus =

Species of fungus

Phycomyces blakesleeanus is a filamentous fungus in the Order Mucorales of the phylum Zygomycota or subphylum Mucoromycotina. The spore-bearing sporangiophores of Phycomyces are very sensitive to different environmental signals including light, gravity, wind, chemicals, and adjacent objects. They exhibit phototropic growth: most Phycomyces research has focused on sporangiophore photobiology, such as phototropism and photomecism ('light growth response'). Metabolic, developmental, and photoresponse mutants have been isolated, some of which have been genetically mapped. At least ten different genes (named madA through to madJ) are required for phototropism. The madA gene encodes a protein related to the White Collar-1 class of photoreceptors that are present in other fungi, while madB encodes a protein related to the White Collar-2 protein that physically bind to White collar 1 to participate in the responses to light.

Phycomyces also exhibits an avoidance response, in which the growing sporangiophore avoids solid objects in its path, bending away from them without touching them, and then continuing to grow upward again. This response is believed to result from an unidentified "avoidance gas" that is emitted by the growing zone of the sporangiophore. This gas would concentrate in the airspace between the Phycomyces and the object. This higher concentration would be detected by the side of the sporangiophore's growing zone, which would grow faster, causing the sporangiophore to bend away.

Phycomyces blakesleeanus became the primary organism of research of the Nobel laureate Max Delbrück starting in the 1950s when Delbrück decided to switch from research on bacteriophage and bacteria to P. blakesleeanus.

A genetic linkage map was developed for P. blakesleeanus. This genetic map was constructed from 121 progeny of a cross between two wild type isolates and involved 134 markers. The markers were mostly PCR-based restriction fragment length polymorphisms. Zygospores are the sexual structures of P. blakesleeanus in which the diploid zygote is formed and meiosis is presumed to take place. The data from this cross provided supporting evidence for meiosis during zygospore development.

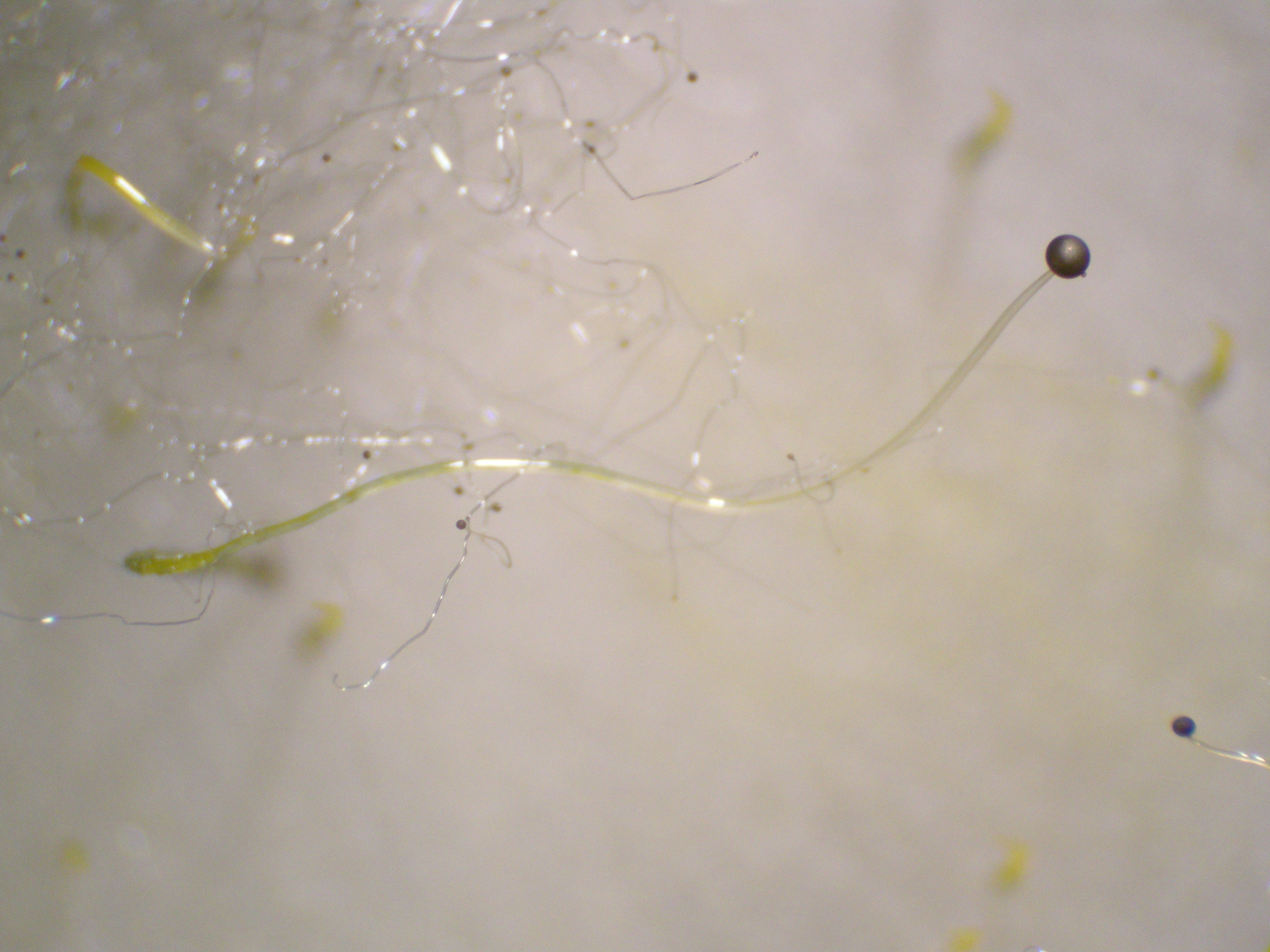
Phycomyces blakesleeanus asexual sporangium

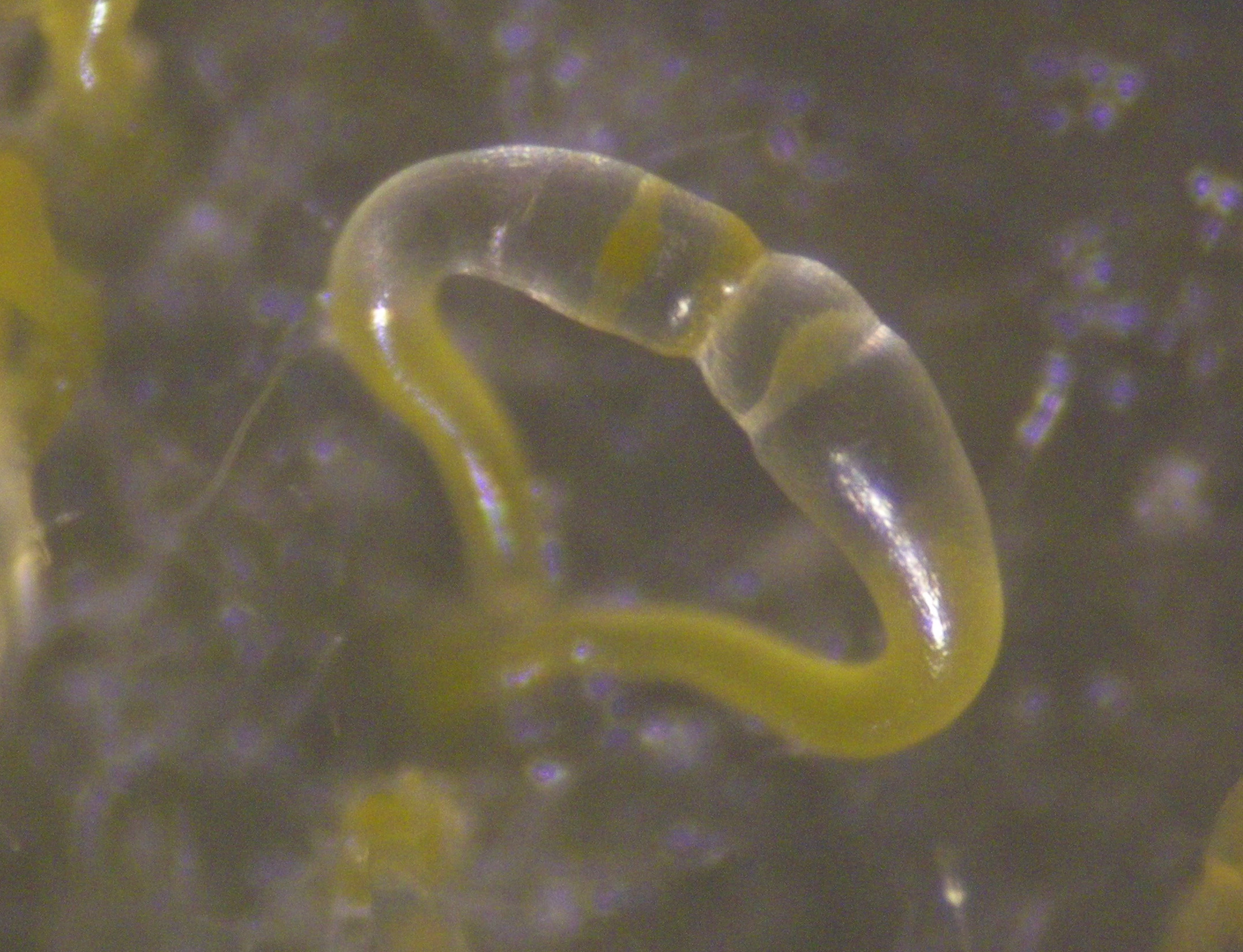
Phycomyces blakesleeanus gametangia
