= JAKMIP3 =

Protein-coding gene in the species Homo sapiens

Identifiers
- Aliases: JAKMIP3, C10orf14, C10orf39, Jamip3, NECC2, bA140A10.5, Janus kinase and microtubule interacting protein 3
- External IDs: OMIM: 611198; MGI: 1921254; HomoloGene: 90425; GeneCards: JAKMIP3; OMA:JAKMIP3 - orthologs

Gene location (Human)
Chr.	Chromosome 10 (human)
Band	10q26.3	Start	132,036,336 bp
Band	10q26.3	End	132,184,858 bp
RNA expression pattern
Bgee	Human / Mouse (ortholog); Top expressed in: C1 segment; corpus callosum; right hemisphere of cerebellum; right frontal lobe; postcentral gyrus; pituitary gland; Brodmann area 9; anterior pituitary; hypothalamus; substantia nigra / n/a; More reference expression data
BioGPS	n/a
Orthologs
Species	Human	Mouse
Entrez	282973	74004
Ensembl	ENSG00000188385	ENSMUSG00000056856
UniProt	Q5VZ66	Q5DTN8
RefSeq (mRNA)	NM_001104947; NM_001105521; NM_194303; NM_001323086; NM_001323087 NM_001323088; NM_001323089; NM_001323090	NM_028708
RefSeq (protein)	NP_001098991; NP_001310015; NP_001310016; NP_001310017; NP_001310018 NP_001310019	NP_082984
Location (UCSC)	Chr 10: 132.04 – 132.18 Mb	n/a
PubMed search
- Wikidata
View/Edit Human	View/Edit Mouse

Janus kinase and microtubule interacting protein 3 is a protein that in humans is encoded by the JAKMIP3 gene.
