= GOLGA3 =

Protein-coding gene in the species Homo sapiens

Identifiers
- Aliases: GOLGA3, GCP170, MEA-2, golgin A3, Golgin 160
- External IDs: OMIM: 602581; MGI: 96958; GeneCards: GOLGA3

Gene location (Human)
Chr.	Chromosome 12 (human)
Band	12q24.33	Start	132,768,914 bp
Band	12q24.33	End	132,829,078 bp

Gene location (Mouse)
Chr.	Chromosome 5 (mouse)
Band	5 F|5 53.36 cM	Start	110,324,567 bp
Band	5 F|5 53.36 cM	End	110,374,336 bp
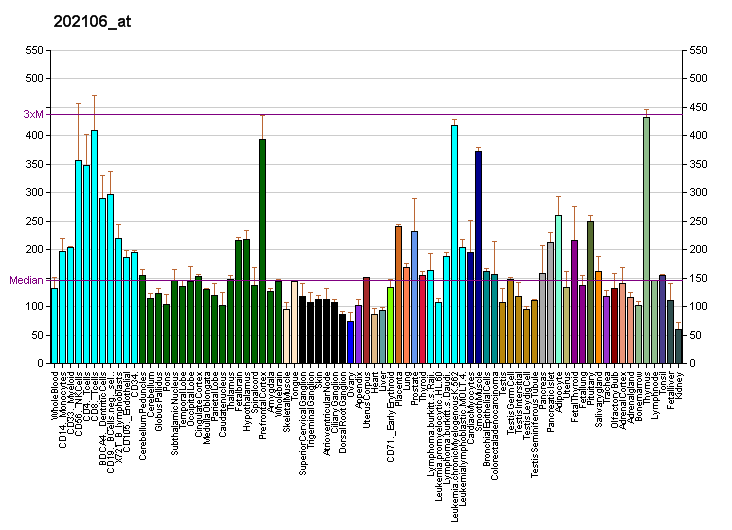
RNA expression pattern
Bgee	Human / Mouse (ortholog); Top expressed in: tendon of biceps brachii; tibia; thymus; internal globus pallidus; cardia; stromal cell of endometrium; saphenous vein; oocyte; dorsal motor nucleus of vagus nerve; pylorus / Top expressed in: ankle; muscle of thigh; right ventricle; seminiferous tubule; molar; calvaria; medullary collecting duct; atrioventricular valve; myocardium of ventricle; soleus muscle; More reference expression data
BioGPS	More reference expression data
Gene ontology
Molecular function	protein binding; transporter activity; cadherin binding
Cellular component	cytoplasm; Golgi transport complex; Golgi cisterna membrane; cytosol; Golgi membrane; Golgi apparatus; nucleolus; membrane; nucleus; nucleoplasm; extrinsic component of Golgi membrane
Biological process	intra-Golgi vesicle-mediated transport; spermatogenesis
Sources:Amigo / QuickGO
Orthologs
Databases	NCBI: entry; OMA: entry
Species	Human	Mouse
Entrez	2802	269682
Ensembl	ENSG00000090615	ENSMUSG00000029502
UniProt	Q08378	P55937
RefSeq (mRNA)	NM_001172557; NM_005895	NM_008146; NM_001347389
RefSeq (protein)	NP_001166028; NP_005886	NP_001334318; NP_032172
Location (UCSC)	Chr 12: 132.77 – 132.83 Mb	Chr 5: 110.32 – 110.37 Mb
PubMed search
- Wikidata
View/Edit Human	View/Edit Mouse

Golgin subfamily A member 3 is a protein that in humans is encoded by the GOLGA3 gene.

The Golgi apparatus, which participates in glycosylation and transport of proteins and lipids in the secretory pathway, consists of a series of stacked cisternae (flattened membrane sacs). Interactions between the Golgi and microtubules are thought to be important for the reorganization of the Golgi after it fragments during mitosis.

This gene encodes a member of the golgin family of proteins which are localized to the Golgi. Its encoded protein has been postulated to play a role in nuclear transport and Golgi apparatus localization. Several alternatively spliced transcript variants of this gene have been described, but the full-length nature of these variants has not been determined.
