= GCC1 =

Protein-coding gene in the species Homo sapiens

Identifiers
- Aliases: GCC1, GCC1P, GCC88, GRIP and coiled-coil domain containing 1
- External IDs: OMIM: 607418; MGI: 1921625; GeneCards: GCC1

Gene location (Human)
Chr.	Chromosome 7 (human)
Band	7q32.1	Start	127,580,628 bp
Band	7q32.1	End	127,593,611 bp

Gene location (Mouse)
Chr.	Chromosome 6 (mouse)
Band	6|6 A3.3	Start	28,416,090 bp
Band	6|6 A3.3	End	28,428,389 bp
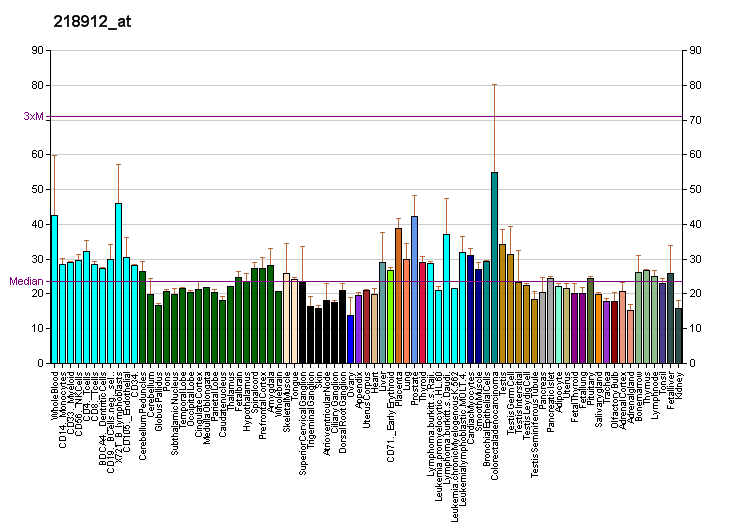
RNA expression pattern
Bgee	Human / Mouse (ortholog); Top expressed in: secondary oocyte; islet of Langerhans; granulocyte; stromal cell of endometrium; blood; right testis; left testis; sperm; nipple; skin of thigh / Top expressed in: granulocyte; supraoptic nucleus; ascending aorta; spermatocyte; islet of Langerhans; aortic valve; stria vascularis; spermatid; jejunum; transitional epithelium of urinary bladder; More reference expression data
BioGPS	More reference expression data
Orthologs
Databases	NCBI: entry; OMA: entry
Species	Human	Mouse
Entrez	79571	74375
Ensembl	ENSG00000179562	ENSMUSG00000029708
UniProt	Q96CN9	Q9D4H2
RefSeq (mRNA)	NM_024523	NM_028900
RefSeq (protein)	NP_078799	NP_083176
Location (UCSC)	Chr 7: 127.58 – 127.59 Mb	Chr 6: 28.42 – 28.43 Mb
PubMed search
- Wikidata
View/Edit Human	View/Edit Mouse

GRIP and coiled-coil domain-containing protein 1 is a protein that in humans is encoded by the GCC1 gene.

== Function ==
The protein encoded by this gene is a peripheral membrane protein. It is sensitive to brefeldin A. This encoded protein contains a GRIP domain which is thought to be used in targeting. It may play a role in the organization of trans-Golgi network subcompartment involved with membrane transport.

== Interactions ==
GCC1 has been shown to interact with TRIM29.
