= GOLGA8A =

Protein-coding gene in the species Homo sapiens

Identifiers
- Aliases: GOLGA8A, GM88, golgin A8 family member A, GOLGA8B, CFAP286, FAP286
- External IDs: OMIM: 616180; GeneCards: GOLGA8A

Gene location (Human)
Chr.	Chromosome 15 (human)
Band	15q14	Start	34,379,068 bp
Band	15q14	End	34,437,808 bp
RNA expression pattern
Bgee	Human / Mouse (ortholog); Top expressed in: sural nerve; right hemisphere of cerebellum; left lobe of thyroid gland; right lobe of thyroid gland; left ovary; cerebellar vermis; right ovary; Brodmann area 23; sperm; skin of hip / n/a; More reference expression data
BioGPS	n/a
Orthologs
Databases	NCBI: entry; OMA: entry
Species	Human	Mouse
Entrez	23015	n/a
Ensembl	ENSG00000175265	n/a
UniProt	A7E2F4; A1A4C0	n/a
RefSeq (mRNA)	NM_181077; NM_001368071; NM_001368072; NM_001386893; NM_001386895 NM_015003; NM_181076	n/a
RefSeq (protein)	NP_851422; NP_001355000; NP_001355001	n/a
Location (UCSC)	Chr 15: 34.38 – 34.44 Mb	n/a
PubMed search		n/a
- Wikidata
View/Edit Human

Golgin A8 family member A is a protein that in humans is encoded by the GOLGA8A gene.

== Function ==
The Golgi apparatus, which participates in glycosylation and transport of proteins and lipids in the secretory pathway, consists of a series of stacked, flattened membrane sacs referred to as cisternae. Interactions between the Golgi and microtubules are thought to be important for the reorganization of the Golgi after it fragments during mitosis. The golgins constitute a family of proteins which are localized to the Golgi. This gene encodes a golgin which structurally resembles its family member GOLGA2, suggesting that they may share a similar function. There are many similar copies of this gene on chromosome 15. Alternative splicing results in multiple transcript variants.
