= Golgin subfamily A member 1 =

Protein-coding gene in the species Homo sapiens

GOLGA1
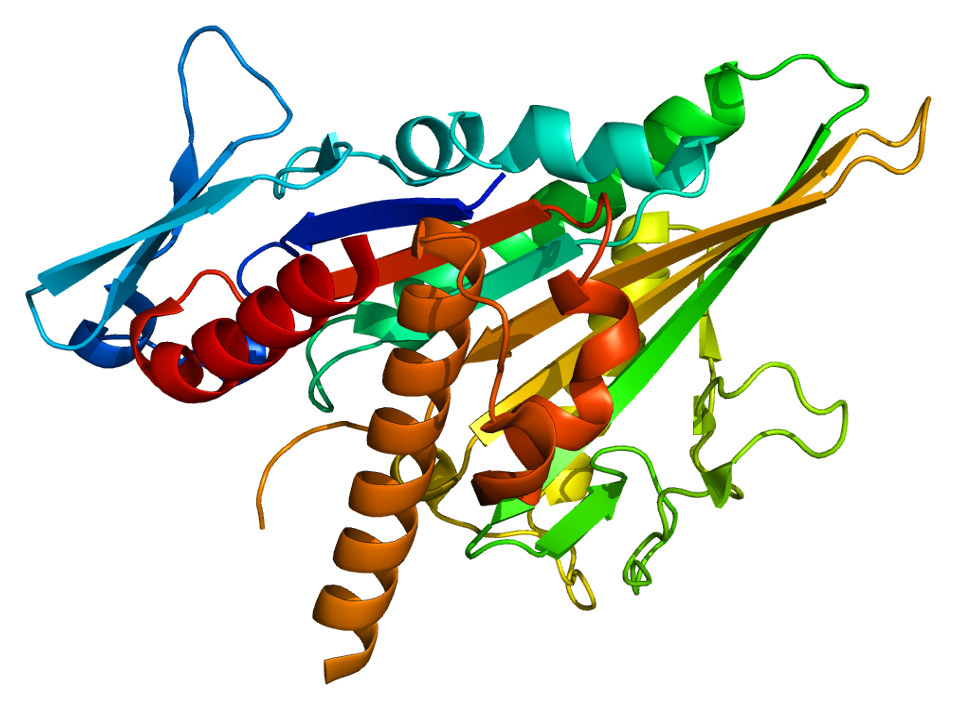

Identifiers
- Aliases: GOLGA1, golgin-97, golgin A1
- External IDs: OMIM: 602502; MGI: 1924149; GeneCards: GOLGA1

Gene location (Human)
Chr.	Chromosome 9 (human)
Band	9q33.3	Start	124,878,275 bp
Band	9q33.3	End	124,948,492 bp

Gene location (Mouse)
Chr.	Chromosome 2 (mouse)
Band	2|2 B	Start	38,906,167 bp
Band	2|2 B	End	38,955,553 bp
RNA expression pattern
Bgee	Human / Mouse (ortholog); Top expressed in: sural nerve; epithelium of colon; gonad; Achilles tendon; testicle; right adrenal gland; right adrenal cortex; stromal cell of endometrium; right lobe of liver; gastric mucosa / Top expressed in: otolith organ; utricle; spermatocyte; tail of embryo; genital tubercle; hand; Rostral migratory stream; neural layer of retina; lacrimal gland; cerebellar cortex; More reference expression data
BioGPS	n/a
Orthologs
Databases	NCBI: entry; OMA: entry
Species	Human	Mouse
Entrez	2800	76899
Ensembl	ENSG00000136935	ENSMUSG00000026754
UniProt	Q92805	Q9CW79
RefSeq (mRNA)	NM_002077	NM_001290649; NM_029793
RefSeq (protein)	NP_002068	NP_001277578; NP_084069
Location (UCSC)	Chr 9: 124.88 – 124.95 Mb	Chr 2: 38.91 – 38.96 Mb
PubMed search
- Wikidata
View/Edit Human	View/Edit Mouse

Golgin subfamily A member 1 is a protein that in humans is encoded by the GOLGA1 gene.

The Golgi apparatus, which participates in glycosylation and transport of proteins and lipids in the secretory pathway, consists of a series of stacked cisternae (flattened membrane sacs). Interactions between the Golgi and microtubules are thought to be important for the reorganization of the Golgi after it fragments during mitosis. The golgins are a family of proteins, of which the protein encoded by this gene is a member, that are localized to the Golgi. This encoded protein is associated with Sjogren's syndrome.

== Interactions ==
GOLGA1 has been shown to interact with ARL1.
