= Basílica de Nuestra Señora de la Merced =

Basílica de Nuestra Señora de la Merced may refer to:

- Basilica of Nuestra Señora de la Merced (Lima)
- Basílica de Nuestra Señora de la Merced (Quito)
- Basilica of Our Lady of Mercy, Barcelona
- Basilica of Our Lady of Mercy (Yarumal)
