= Golgin A7 =

Protein-coding gene in the species Homo sapiens

GOLGA7

Identifiers
- Aliases: GOLGA7, GCP16, GOLGA3AP1, GOLGA7A, HSPC041, golgin A7
- External IDs: OMIM: 609453; MGI: 1931029; HomoloGene: 9385; GeneCards: GOLGA7; OMA:GOLGA7 - orthologs

Gene location (Human)
Chr.	Chromosome 8 (human)
Band	8p11.21	Start	41,490,396 bp
Band	8p11.21	End	41,510,980 bp

Gene location (Mouse)
Chr.	Chromosome 8 (mouse)
Band	8|8 A2	Start	23,731,362 bp
Band	8|8 A2	End	23,747,090 bp
RNA expression pattern
Bgee	Human / Mouse (ortholog); Top expressed in: inferior ganglion of vagus nerve; corpus callosum; superior vestibular nucleus; spinal cord; C1 segment; optic nerve; subthalamic nucleus; ventral tegmental area; skin of thigh; secondary oocyte / Top expressed in: neural tube; ganglionic eminence; ventricular zone; pons; stomach; medulla oblongata; olfactory bulb; esophagus; spinal cord; mesencephalon; More reference expression data
BioGPS	n/a
Gene ontology
Molecular function	protein binding; protein-cysteine S-palmitoyltransferase activity
Cellular component	palmitoyltransferase complex; Golgi membrane; Golgi stack; Golgi apparatus; intrinsic component of Golgi membrane; extracellular exosome; membrane; extracellular region; tertiary granule lumen
Biological process	peptidyl-L-cysteine S-palmitoylation; protein stabilization; Golgi to plasma membrane protein transport; protein targeting to membrane; neutrophil degranulation
Sources:Amigo / QuickGO
Orthologs
Species	Human	Mouse
Entrez	51125	57437
Ensembl	ENSG00000147533	ENSMUSG00000015341
UniProt	Q7Z5G4	Q91W53
RefSeq (mRNA)	NM_016099; NM_001002296; NM_001174124	NM_001042484; NM_020585
RefSeq (protein)	NP_001002296; NP_001167595; NP_057183; NP_001349908; NP_001349909	NP_001035949; NP_065610
Location (UCSC)	Chr 8: 41.49 – 41.51 Mb	Chr 8: 23.73 – 23.75 Mb
PubMed search
- Wikidata
View/Edit Human	View/Edit Mouse

Golgin A7 is a protein that in humans is encoded by the GOLGA7 gene. It is an acylated Golgi protein that interacts with GCP170 protein.

The protein is 137 amino acids long.
