= GRIP domain =

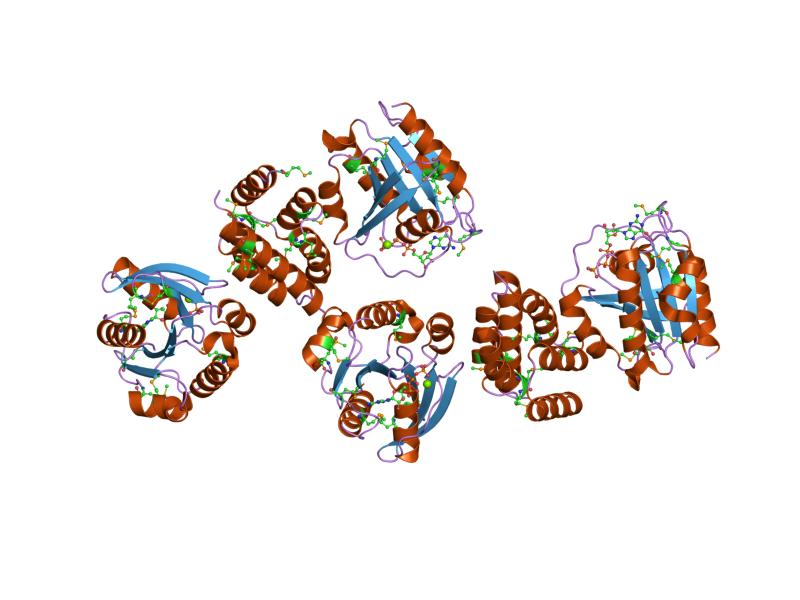
- structure of a complex of the golgin-245 grip domain with arl1

Identifiers
- Symbol: GRIP
- Pfam: PF01465
- InterPro: IPR000237
- SCOP2: 1upt / SCOPe / SUPFAM
Available protein structures:
- PDB: IPR000237 PF01465 (ECOD; PDBsum)
- AlphaFold: IPR000237; PF01465

In molecular biology, the GRIP domain is a conserved protein domain. The GRIP (golgin-97, RanBP2alpha, Imh1p and p230/golgin-245) domain is found in many large coiled-coil proteins. It has been shown to be sufficient for targeting to the Golgi. It contains a completely conserved tyrosine residue.
