= GOLGA4 =

Protein-coding gene in the species Homo sapiens

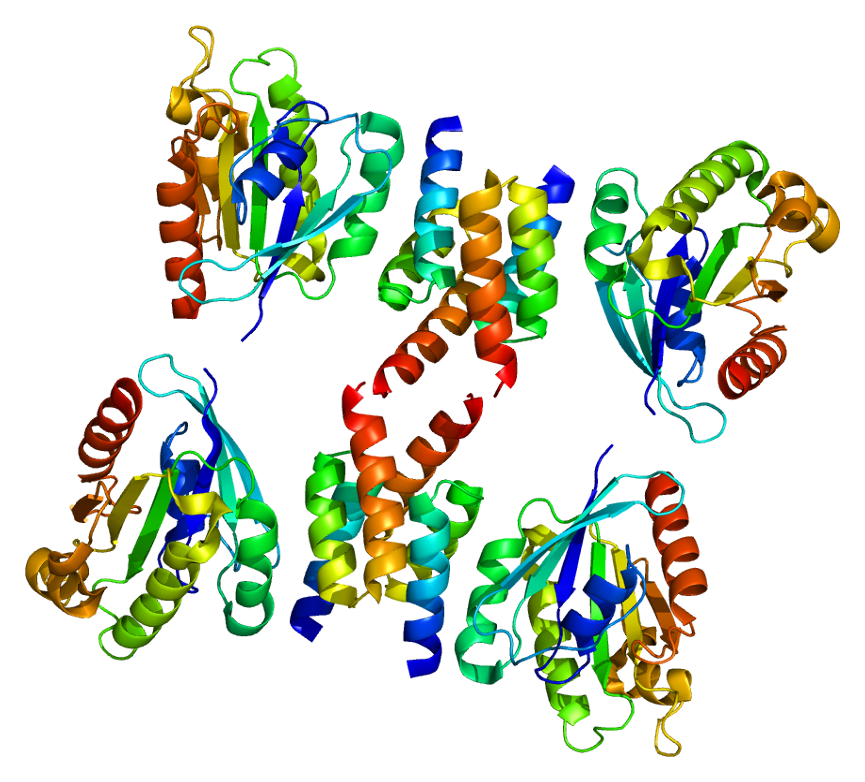

Identifiers
- Aliases: GOLGA4, CRPF46, GCP2, GOLG, MU-RMS-40.18, golgin A4, Trans-GolgiI p230, Golgin 245, p230
- External IDs: OMIM: 602509; MGI: 1859646; GeneCards: GOLGA4
Available structures
PDB	Ortholog search: PDBe RCSB
PDB	List of PDB id codes 1R4A, 1UPT

Gene location (Human)
Chr.	Chromosome 3 (human)
Band	3p22.2	Start	37,243,191 bp
Band	3p22.2	End	37,366,879 bp

Gene location (Mouse)
Chr.	Chromosome 9 (mouse)
Band	9|9 F3	Start	118,506,267 bp
Band	9|9 F3	End	118,582,519 bp
RNA expression pattern
Bgee	Human / Mouse (ortholog); Top expressed in: glutes; jejunal mucosa; biceps brachii; Skeletal muscle tissue of rectus abdominis; thoracic diaphragm; right ventricle; Skeletal muscle tissue of biceps brachii; myocardium of left ventricle; cartilage tissue; triceps brachii muscle / Top expressed in: muscle of thigh; digastric muscle; Paneth cell; triceps brachii muscle; soleus muscle; vastus lateralis muscle; plantaris muscle; temporal muscle; Rostral migratory stream; tibialis anterior muscle; More reference expression data
BioGPS	n/a
Gene ontology
Molecular function	GTPase binding; protein binding
Cellular component	cytoplasm; Golgi membrane; trans-Golgi network; Golgi apparatus; extracellular exosome; intracellular membrane-bounded organelle; membrane; cytosol
Biological process	positive regulation of axon extension; vesicle-mediated transport; Golgi to plasma membrane protein transport
Sources:Amigo / QuickGO
Orthologs
Databases	NCBI: entry; OMA: entry
Species	Human	Mouse
Entrez	2803	54214
Ensembl	ENSG00000144674	ENSMUSG00000038708
UniProt	Q13439; Q49A56	Q91VW5
RefSeq (mRNA)	NM_001172713; NM_002078	NM_018748
RefSeq (protein)	NP_001166184; NP_002069; NP_001166184.1; NP_002069.2	NP_061218
Location (UCSC)	Chr 3: 37.24 – 37.37 Mb	Chr 9: 118.51 – 118.58 Mb
PubMed search
- Wikidata
View/Edit Human	View/Edit Mouse

Golgin subfamily A member 4 is a protein that in humans is encoded by the GOLGA4 gene.

The Golgi apparatus, which participates in glycosylation and transport of proteins and lipids in the secretory pathway, consists of a series of stacked cisternae (flattened membrane sacs). Interactions between the Golgi and microtubules are thought to be important for the reorganization of the Golgi after it fragments during mitosis. The golgins are a family of proteins, of which the protein encoded by this gene is a member, that are localized to the Golgi. This protein has been postulated to play a role in Rab6-regulated membrane-tethering events in the Golgi apparatus. Alternative splice variants have been described but their full-length nature has not been determined.

== Interactions ==
GOLGA4 has been shown to interact with ARL1.
