= JAKMIP2 =

Protein-coding gene in the species Homo sapiens

Identifiers
- Aliases: JAKMIP2, JAMIP2, NECC1, janus kinase and microtubule interacting protein 2
- External IDs: OMIM: 611197; MGI: 1923467; HomoloGene: 8866; GeneCards: JAKMIP2; OMA:JAKMIP2 - orthologs

Gene location (Human)
Chr.	Chromosome 5 (human)
Band	5q32	Start	147,585,438 bp
Band	5q32	End	147,782,775 bp

Gene location (Mouse)
Chr.	Chromosome 18 (mouse)
Band	18|18 B3	Start	43,664,472 bp
Band	18|18 B3	End	43,820,838 bp
RNA expression pattern
Bgee	Human / Mouse (ortholog); Top expressed in: ventricular zone; sural nerve; middle temporal gyrus; ganglionic eminence; corpus callosum; dorsal motor nucleus of vagus nerve; entorhinal cortex; prefrontal cortex; postcentral gyrus; Brodmann area 46 / Top expressed in: habenula; piriform cortex; lobe of cerebellum; mammillary body; anterior amygdaloid area; ventromedial nucleus; subiculum; cerebellar vermis; lateral hypothalamus; primary motor cortex; More reference expression data
BioGPS	n/a
Orthologs
Species	Human	Mouse
Entrez	9832	76217
Ensembl	ENSG00000176049	ENSMUSG00000024502
UniProt	Q96AA8	D3YXK0
RefSeq (mRNA)	NM_014790; NM_001270934; NM_001270941; NM_001282282	NM_001163637
RefSeq (protein)	NP_001257863; NP_001257870; NP_001269211; NP_055605	NP_001157109
Location (UCSC)	Chr 5: 147.59 – 147.78 Mb	Chr 18: 43.66 – 43.82 Mb
PubMed search
- Wikidata
View/Edit Human	View/Edit Mouse

Janus kinase and microtubule interacting protein 2 is a protein that in humans is encoded by the JAKMIP2 gene.

== Function ==
The protein encoded by this gene is reported to be a component of the Golgi matrix. It may act as a golgin protein by negatively regulating transit of secretory cargo and by acting as a structural scaffold of the Golgi. Alternative splicing results in multiple transcript variants.
