= TMED5 =

Protein-coding gene in humans

Identifiers
- Aliases: TMED5, CGI-100, p28, p24g2, transmembrane p24 trafficking protein 5
- External IDs: OMIM: 616876; MGI: 1921586; GeneCards: TMED5

Gene location (Human)
Chr.	Chromosome 1 (human)
Band	1p22.1	Start	93,149,742 bp
Band	1p22.1	End	93,180,516 bp

Gene location (Mouse)
Chr.	Chromosome 5 (mouse)
Band	5|5 F	Start	108,254,232 bp
Band	5|5 F	End	108,280,486 bp
RNA expression pattern
Bgee	Human / Mouse (ortholog); Top expressed in: Skeletal muscle tissue of biceps brachii; parietal pleura; corpus epididymis; Epithelium of choroid plexus; sperm; mucosa of sigmoid colon; jejunal mucosa; visceral pleura; decidua; thoracic diaphragm / Top expressed in: intercostal muscle; endothelial cell of lymphatic vessel; brown adipose tissue; interventricular septum; hair follicle; seminal vesicula; white adipose tissue; left lobe of liver; cumulus cell; gastrula; More reference expression data
BioGPS	n/a
Gene ontology
Molecular function	protein binding
Cellular component	integral component of membrane; Golgi apparatus; endoplasmic reticulum-Golgi intermediate compartment membrane; endoplasmic reticulum-Golgi intermediate compartment; endoplasmic reticulum exit site; endoplasmic reticulum membrane; cis-Golgi network; membrane; endoplasmic reticulum; COPII-coated ER to Golgi transport vesicle
Biological process	protein transport; Golgi ribbon formation; intracellular protein transport; endoplasmic reticulum to Golgi vesicle-mediated transport; Golgi organization
Sources:Amigo / QuickGO
Orthologs
Databases	NCBI: entry; OMA: entry
Species	Human	Mouse
Entrez	50999	73130
Ensembl	ENSG00000117500	ENSMUSG00000063406
UniProt	Q9Y3A6	Q9CXE7
RefSeq (mRNA)	NM_001167830; NM_016040	NM_028876; NM_001347383; NM_001361466; NM_001361467
RefSeq (protein)	NP_001161302; NP_057124	NP_001334312; NP_083152; NP_001348395; NP_001348396
Location (UCSC)	Chr 1: 93.15 – 93.18 Mb	Chr 5: 108.25 – 108.28 Mb
PubMed search
- Wikidata
View/Edit Human	View/Edit Mouse

Transmembrane emp24 domain-containing protein 5 is a protein that in humans is encoded by the TMED5 gene.

== Gene ==
=== General properties ===
TMED5 (transmembrane emp24 domain-containing protein 5) is also known as p28, p24g2, and CGI-100. The human gene spans 30,775 base pairs over 4 exons and 3 introns for transcript variant 1, 5 exons and 4 introns for transcript variant 2, and it is located on the minus strand of chromosome 1, at 1p22.1.

=== Expression ===
TMED5 has ubiquitous expression with transcripts detected in 246 tissues. Androgen deprivation led to lower expression in mice splenocytes compared to the control. Human dendritic cells infected with Chlamydia pneumoniae showed an absence of TMED5 expression compared to uninfected dendritic cells which had moderate expression.

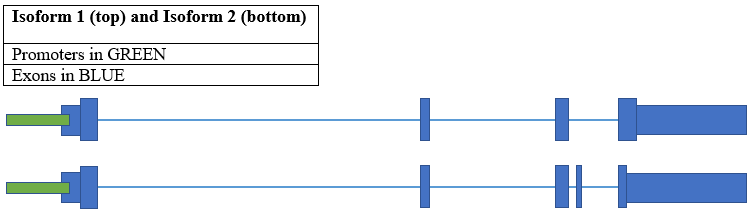
View of human TMED5 gene isoform 1 and 2 with promoter and exon locations

Conceptual translation of TMED5. Labeled are the start and stop codon, exon splice sites, domains and motifs, polyadenylation signals, predicted RNA and miRNA binding proteins, and predicted post-translational modifications. Bolded amino acids and nucleotides represent highly conserved amongst distant orthologs.

== mRNA transcript ==
TMED5 has two coding transcript variants and one non-coding transcript variant produced by alternative splicing. Isoform 1 has 4 exons and encodes a protein 229 amino acids. Isoform 2 has 5 exons and encodes a protein with a shorter C-terminus 193 amino acids due to an additional exon causing a frameshift.

== Protein ==
=== General properties ===
TMED5 contains a signal peptide. After cleavage of the signal peptide, TMED5 isoform 1 is composed of 202 amino acids and has a molecular weight of ~23 kDa. The mature form of isoform 2 is composed of 166 amino acids and has a molecular weight of ~19 kDa. Both isoforms have an isolectric point of approximately 4.6.

=== Composition ===
Compared to the reference set of human proteins, TMED5 has fewer alanine and proline residues but more aspartic acid and phenylalanine residues. TMED5 isoform 1 has one hydrophobic segment that corresponds with its transmembrane region.

=== Domains and motifs ===
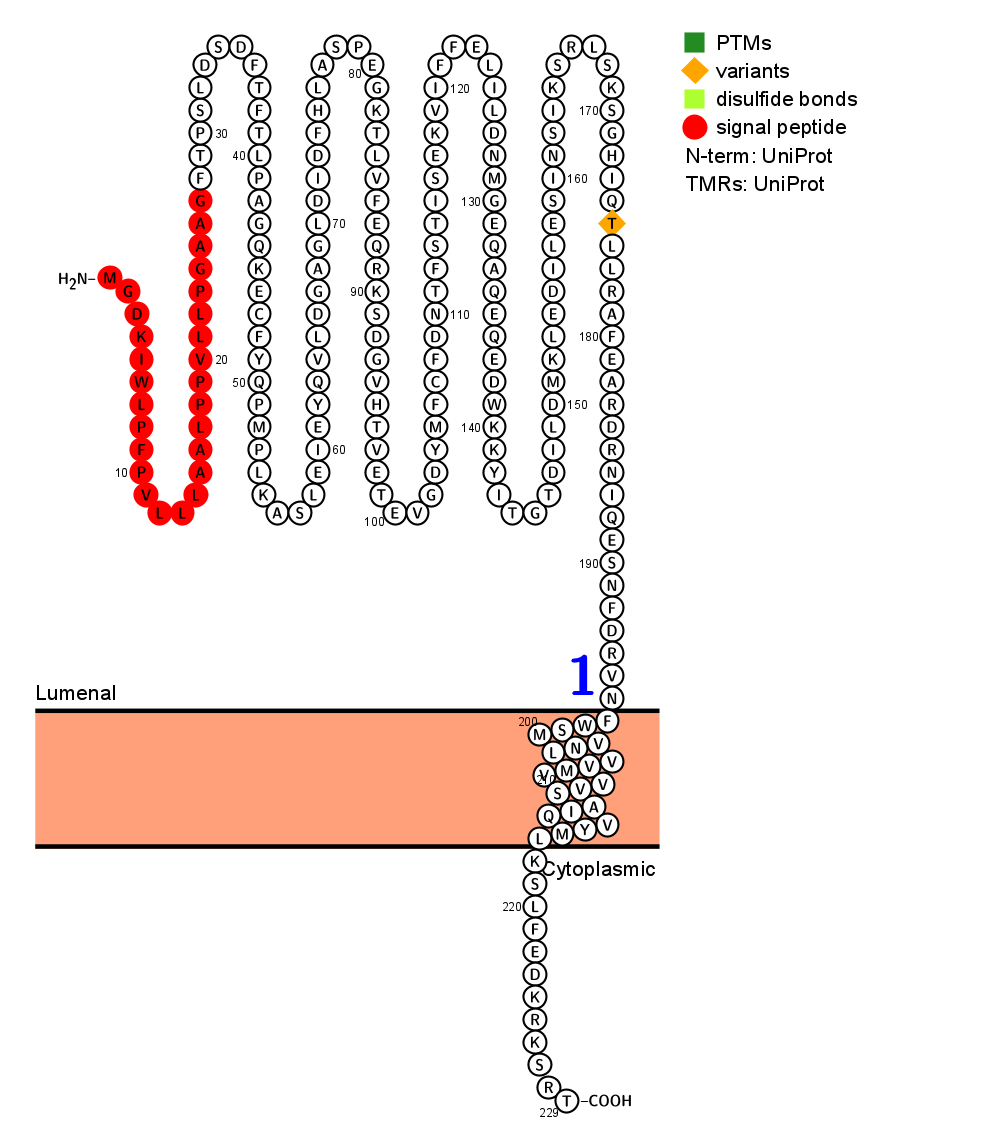
TMED5 protein isoform 1 visual made via Protter

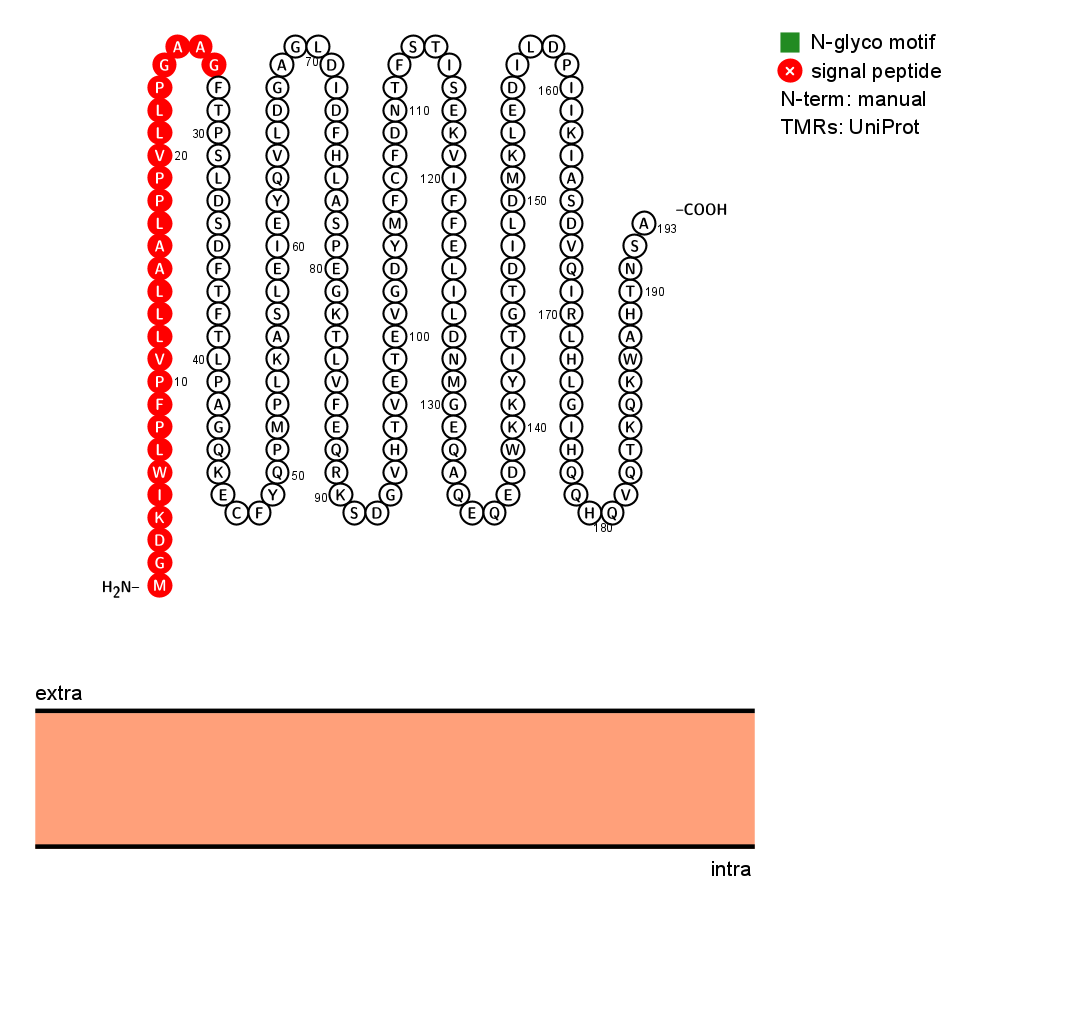
TMED5 protein isoform 2 visual made via Protter

TMED5 isoform 1 is a single-pass transmembrane protein and is composed of a lumenal domain, one transmembrane (helical) domain, and a cytoplasmic domain.

TMED5 is part of the emp24/gp25L/p24 family/GOLD family protein.

TMED5 contains a di-lysine motif and predicted NLS in its cytoplasmic tail.

=== Structure ===
The structure of TMED5 isoform 1 consists of beta strands making up the lumenal region, disparate coil-coiled regions, alpha helices making up the transmembrane domain, and alpha helices making up some of the cytoplasmic domain.

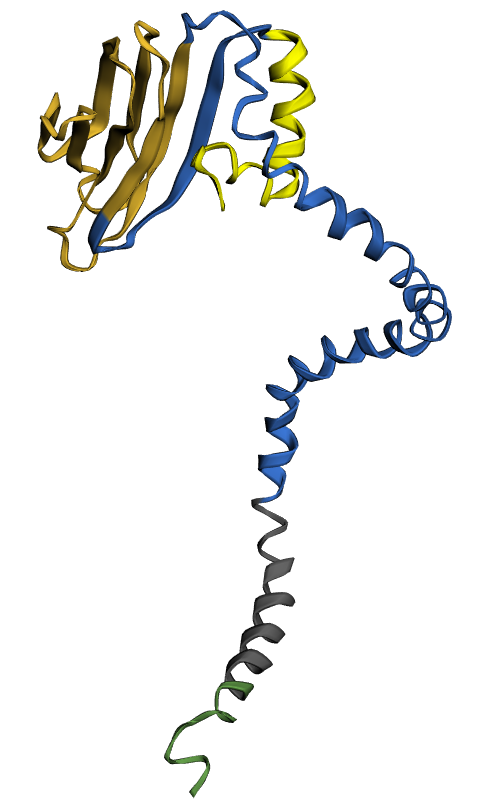
Predicted tertiary structure of TMED5 generated by Phyre2. Signal peptide is highlighted in yellow. GOLD domain in the lumen is shown to be made up of beta sheets. Transmembrane domain is grayed out followed by the short cytosolic sequence.

=== Post-translational modifications ===
TMED5 has two predicted phosphorylation sites in the cytosolic region, Ser227 and Thr229.

=== Localization ===
TMED5's predicted location is in the plasma membrane, with an extracellular N-terminus and intracellular C-terminus. TMED5's localization is predicted to be cytoplasmic, but has been found in some tissues to be located in the nucleus.

=== Interacting proteins ===
The following table provides a list of proteins most likely to interact with TMED5. Not shown in the table are Wnt family proteins which are known to interact with the p24 protein family.

Protein Name	Protein Abrev	DB Source	Species	Evidence	Interaction	PubMed ID
Transmembrane emp24 domain-containing protein 2	TMED2	IntAct	Homo sapiens	Anti tag coimmunoprecipitation	Association	28514442
Transmembrane emp24 domain-containing protein 10	TMED10	IntAct	Mus musculus	Anti tag coimmunoprecipitation	Association	26496610
Protein ERGIC-53	LMAN1	MINT	Homo sapiens	Fluorescence microscopy	Colocalization	22094269
C-X-C motif chemokine 9	CXCL9	IntAct	Homo sapiens	Validated two hybrid	Physical Association	32296183
Protein arginine N-methyltransferase 6	PRMT6	MINT	Homo sapiens	Two hybrid	Physical Association	23455924
Phosphatidylethanolamine-binding protein 1	PEBP1	IntAct	Homo sapiens	Anti tag coimmunoprecipitation	Association	31980649
Kinase suppressor of Ras 1	KSR1	IntAct	Homo sapiens	Anti tag coimmunoprecipitation	Association	27086506
Endothelial lipase	LIPG	IntAct	Mus musculus	Anti tag coimmunoprecipitation	Association	28514442
Histone-lysine N-methyltransferase PRDM16	Prdm16	MINT	Mus musculus	Anti tag coimmunoprecipitation	Association	30462309
Intracellular growth locus, subunit C	iglC2	MINT	Francisella tularensis	Two hybrid pooling approach	Physical Association	26714771
ORF9C	ORF9C	BioGRID	SARS-Cov-2	Affinity Capture-MS	Association	32353859
Uncharacterized protein 14	ORF14	IntAct	SARS-Cov-2	Pull down	Association	32353859

== Function and clinical significance ==
TMED5 is a part of the p24 protein family whose general functions are protein trafficking for the secretory pathway. TMED5 is thought to be necessary in the formation of the Golgi into a ribbon.

Glycosylphosphatidylinositol-anchored proteins (GPI-AP) depend on p24 cargo receptors for transport from the ER to the Golgi. Knockdown of p24γ2 (a mouse ortholog of TMED5) in mice resulted in impaired transport of GPI-AP. The study concluded that the α-helical region of p24γ2 binds GPI which is necessary to incorporate it into COPII transport vesicles.

TMED5 is reported to be necessary for the secretion of Wnt ligands. TMED5 has been found to interact with WNT7B, activating the canonical WNT-CTNNB1/β-catenin signaling pathway. This pathway is linked to numerous cancers because upregulation of the Wnt/β-catenin signaling pathway leads to cytosolic accumulation of β-catenin, promoting cellular proliferation.

Research has identified bladder cancer to have a common chromosomal amplification at 1p21-22 and showed significant upregulation of TMED5.

== Evolution ==
=== Homology ===
==== Paralogs ====
TMED5 paralogs include TMED1, TMED2, TMED3, TMED4, TMED6, TMED7, TMED8, TMED9, and TMED10. All paralogs share the conserved transmembrane domain and contain the characteristic GOLD domain as included in the emp24/gp25L/p24 family/GOLD family proteins.

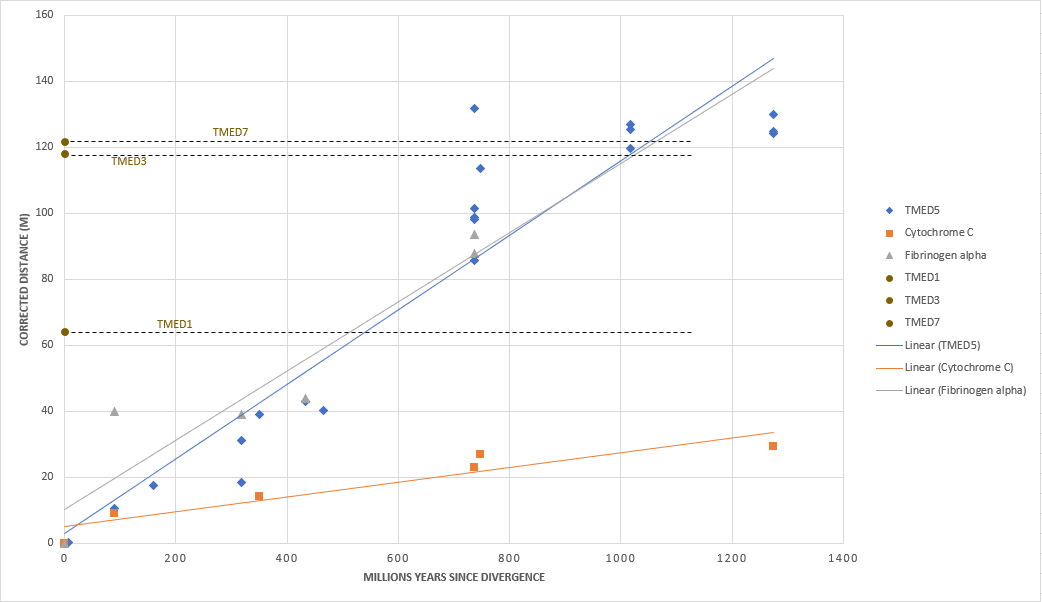
TMED5 evolutionary graph shows evolutionary rate. Cytochrome C is shown to represent a slow-evolutionary rate and Fibrinogen alpha represents a fast-evolutionary rate. TMED5 is shown to have a fast-evolutionary rate similar to Fibrinogen alpha. Estimated date of divergence for paralogs were plotted: TMED1 diverged ~64 million years ago (MYA), TMED3 diverged ~118 MYA, and TMED7 diverged ~122 MYA.

==== Orthologs ====
TMED5 is found to be conserved in vertebrates, invertebrates, plants and fungi, and there are 243 known organisms that have orthologs with the gene. The following table provides a sample of the ortholog space of TMED5.

Genus and species	NCBI Accession Number	Date of Divergence (MYA)	Sequence length	Sequence identity
Homo sapiens (Human)	NP_057124.3	0	229	100
Pan troglodytes (Chimpanzee)	XP_001154650.1	6	229	99.6
Mus musculus (Mouse)	NP_083152.1	89	229	90
Monodelphis domestica (Gray short-tailed opossum)	XP_016284519.1	160	228	84
Gallus gallus (Chicken)	NP_001007957.1	318	226	83
Gekko japonicus (Gekko)	XP_015268825.1	318	245	73.1
Xenopus tropicalis (Western clawed frog)	XP_031755940.1	351	223	67.7
Danio rerio (Zebrafish)	NP_956697.1	433	225	65.1
Rhincodon typus (Whale shark)	XP_020385910.1	465	224	66.8
Octopus vulgaris (Octopus)	XP_029646555.1	736	239	42.5
Cryptotermes secundus (Termite)	XP_023712535.1	736	235	37.5
Caenorhabditis elegans (Roundworm)	NP_502288.1	736	234	37.3
Drosophila mojavensis (Fruit fly)	XP_002009472.2	736	239	36.3
Eufriesea mexicana (Orchid bee)	XP_017762298.1	736	227	26.8
Trichoplax adhaerens	XP_002108774.1	747	193	32.1
Rhizopus microsporus	XP_023464765.1	1017	199	30.2
Coprinopsis cinerea (Gray shag mushroom)	XP_001836898.2	1017	199	28.5
Kluyveromyces lactis	XP_453709.1	1017	208	28.1
Rhodamnia argentea (Malletwood)	XP_030545696.1	1275	217	28.9
Quercus suber (Cork oak)	XP_023882547.1	1275	277	28.7
Vitis riparia (Riverbank grape)	XP_034686416.1	1275	215	27.3
