= FAM110A =

Protein-coding gene in the species Homo sapiens

Identifiers
- Aliases: FAM110A, C20orf55, F10, bA371L19.3, family with sequence similarity 110 member A
- External IDs: OMIM: 611393; MGI: 1921097; GeneCards: FAM110A

Gene location (Human)
Chr.	Chromosome 20 (human)
Band	20p13	Start	833,715 bp
Band	20p13	End	857,463 bp

Gene location (Mouse)
Chr.	Chromosome 2 (mouse)
Band	2|2 G3	Start	151,811,318 bp
Band	2|2 G3	End	151,822,139 bp
RNA expression pattern
Bgee	Human / Mouse (ortholog); Top expressed in: skin of arm; granulocyte; skin of leg; skin of abdomen; monocyte; blood; oocyte; secondary oocyte; spleen; olfactory zone of nasal mucosa / Top expressed in: seminiferous tubule; lip; ventricular zone; spermatid; granulocyte; neural tube; ganglionic eminence; esophagus; medial ganglionic eminence; embryo; More reference expression data
BioGPS	n/a
Orthologs
Databases	NCBI: entry; OMA: entry
Species	Human	Mouse
Entrez	83541	73847
Ensembl	ENSG00000125898	ENSMUSG00000027459
UniProt	Q9BQ89	Q8R184
RefSeq (mRNA)	NM_001042353; NM_001289145; NM_001289146; NM_001289147; NM_031424 NM_207121	NM_001289150; NM_001289151; NM_028666; NM_146127
RefSeq (protein)	NP_001035812; NP_001276074; NP_001276075; NP_001276076; NP_113612 NP_997004	NP_001276079; NP_001276080; NP_082942; NP_666239; NP_001393330
Location (UCSC)	Chr 20: 0.83 – 0.86 Mb	Chr 2: 151.81 – 151.82 Mb
PubMed search
- Wikidata
View/Edit Human	View/Edit Mouse

Protein FAM110A, also known as protein family with sequence similarity 110, A, C20orf55 or BA371L19.3 is encoded by the FAM110A gene. FAM110A is located on chromosome 20 and is a part of the greater FAM110 gene family, consisting of FAM110A, FAM110B, and FAM110C.

== Gene ==
=== Overview ===
In humans, FAM110A is located on the plus strand at 20p13. The gene transcript is found from base pairs 833,715 to 846,279, with a total transcript length of 12,564 base pairs. The FAM110A mRNA transcript is predicted to contain two exons. An upstream promoter region for FAM110A is predicted to be 1,111 base pairs long. Six different mRNA transcripts of FAM110A are predicted, all differing in their 5' untranslated regions.

FAM110A genomic location on chromosome 20 (pictured in red).

=== Homology ===
219 organisms have been reported to have orthologs with the human FAM110A gene.

FAM110A orthologs (relative to human FAM110A)
Species	Taxonomic group	Date of divergence (MYA)	Accession	Sequence length	Sequence identity	Sequence similarity
Thirteen-lined ground squirrel (Ictidomys tridecemlineatus)	Mammal	90	XP_005320619.1	295	92%	94%
Domesticated dog (Canis lupus familiaris)	Mammal	96	XP_005634952.1	295	91%	93%
Armadillo (Dasypus novemcinctus)	Mammal	105	XP_023446141.1	284	85%	85%
Garter snake (Thamnophis sirtalis)	Reptile	312	XP_013922001.1	360	46%	58%
Painted turtle (Chrysemys picta bellii)	Reptile	312	XP_005304966.1	362	48%	59%
Hummingbird (Calypte anna)	Bird	312	XP_030319175.1	337	53%	61%
Chicken (Gallus gallus)	Bird	312	XP_003642512.1	331	56%	62%
Worm (Microcaecilia unicolor)	Amphibian	351.8	XP_030068004.1	381	39%	49%
Sterlet (Acipenser ruthenus)	Fish	435	XP_033863480.2	350	43%	54%
Zebrafish (Danio rerio)	Fish	435	XP_003201231.1	446	59%	71%
Deer tick (Ixodes scapularis)	Arthropod	797	XP_029825208.1	337	31%	40%

=== Regulation ===
FAM110A transcription factor binding sites
Matrix family	Matrix information	Start position	End position	Strand	Matrix similarity
TGF-β induced apoptosis proteins	Cysteine-serine-rich nuclear protein 1 (AXUD1, AXIN1 up-regulated 1)	277	283	(+)	1.00
CAS interacting zinc finger protein	Zinc finger protein 384 (Cas-interacting zinc finger protein - CIZ)	305	315	(+)	1.00
Lim homeodomain factors	LIM homeobox transcription factor 1, alpha	342	364	(-)	1.00
SWI/SNF related nucleophosphoproteins with a RING finger DNA binding motif	SWI/SNF related, matrix associated, actin dependent regulator of chromatin, subfamily a, member 3	354	364	(-)	1.00
SWI/SNF related nucleophosphoproteins with a RING finger DNA binding motif	SWI/SNF related, matrix associated, actin dependent regulator of chromatin, subfamily a, member 3	357	367	(+)	1.00
Cart-1 (cartilage homeoprotein 1)	Binding site for S8 type homeodomains	421	441	(-)	1.00
NKX homeodomain factors	Homeo domain factor Nkx-2.5/Csx, tinman homolog low affinity sites	423	441	(-)	1.00
TCF11 transcription factor	TCF11/LCR-F1/Nrf1 homodimers	559	565	(+)	1.00
EVI1-myleoid transforming protein	MEL1 (MDS1/EVI1-like gene 1) DNA-binding domain 2	612	628	(-)	1.00
C2H2 zinc finger transcription factors 37	Zinc finger protein 37 alpha (KOX21)	770	778	(-)	1.00
C2H2 zinc finger transcription factors 2	Zinc finger with KRAB and SCAN domains 3	819	841	(-)	1.00
Myeloid zinc finger 1 factors	Myeloid zinc finger protein MZF1	1002	1012	(-)	1.00
C2H2 zinc finger transcription factors 2	KRAB-containing zinc finger protein 300	1014	1036	(+)	1.00
C2H2 zinc finger transcription factors 2	Zinc finger with KRAB and SCAN domains 3	1029	1051	(-)	1.00

== Protein ==
=== Overview ===
All human FAM110A transcript variants encode the same protein, which is 295 amino acids in length. The human FAM110A protein is projected to weigh 31.3 kiladaltons and have an isoelectric point of 10.5.

FAM110A repetitive structures
Species	Accession	Repeating structures	Positions
Human (Homo sapiens)	NP_001035812.1	SPARP	162-166; 177-181
Chimpanzee (Pan troglodytes)	XP_003316845.1	SPARP	162-166; 177-181
Mouse (Mus musculus)	NP_001276079.1	PATP	11-14; 139-142
Chicken (Gallus gallus)	XP_015151953.1	AVRR	88-91; 168-171
		PRSA	104-107; 285-288
		SAGR	106-109; 147-150
		PAAP	158-161; 199-202
Zebrafish (Danio rerio)	XP_009302562.1	LARP	88-91; 348-351

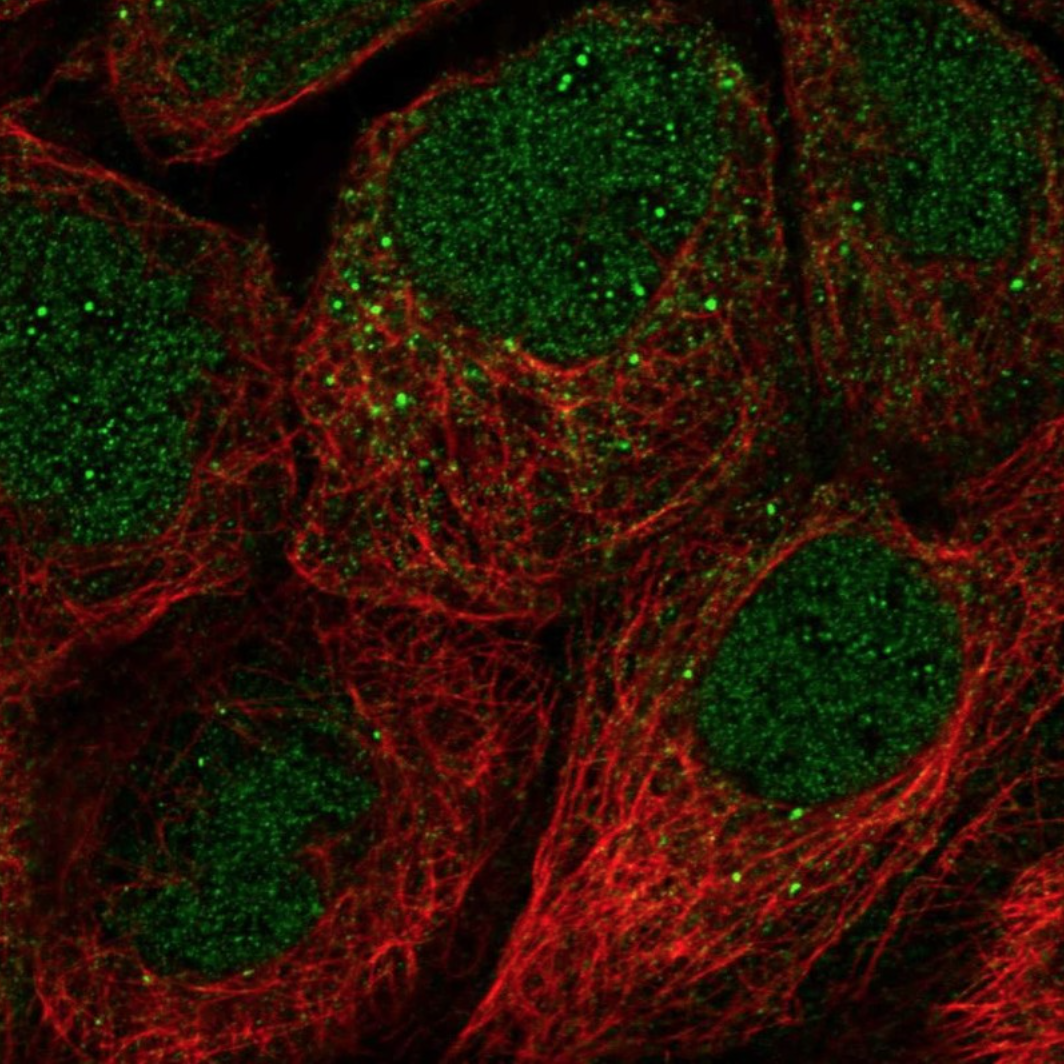
Immunofluorescent staining of FAM110A localization.

Human FAM110A is predicted to contain one standard deviation less than average frequencies of methionine, asparagine, and isoleucine residues, while containing one standard deviation higher frequencies of serine and proline residues. Human FAM110A is also predicted to contain a frequency of arginine residues two standard deviations higher than average. The presence of a high frequency of arginine residues is also apparent in the FAM110A chimpanzee, mouse, chicken and zebrafish orthologs, indicating that it may play a vital role to the function of the gene due to its high conservation.

FAM110A is predicted to be hydrophilic and soluble.

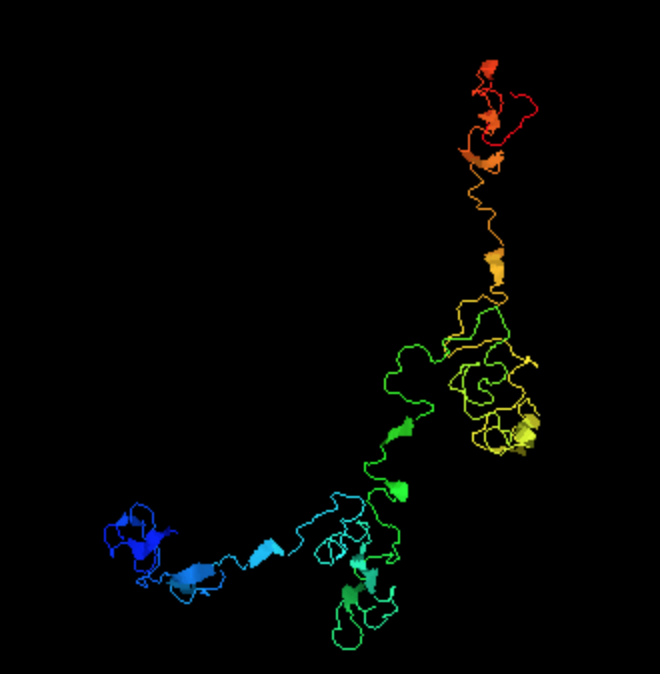
Predicted FAM110A tertiary structure (C-score: -2.81).

The tertiary structure of FAM110A is predicted to be 80% disordered.

=== Post-translational modification ===
The N-terminal glycine residue FAM110A is not predicted to be myristolated (confidence: 0.97), indicating that FAM110A is not membrane-associated.

It is predicted that FAM110A contains no sulfation of tyrosine residues, suggesting that FAM110A is not secreted.

Phosphorylation analysis indicates FAM110A to be associated with the AGC and Akt kinase families.

Immunofluorescent analysis of FAM110A reveals the protein to be localized in the nucleoplasm, cytosol, and vesicles.

=== Interacting proteins ===
Proteins predicted to interact with FAM110A
Protein abbreviation	Protein name	Association type
CSNK1E	Casein kinase 1 isoform ε	Two hybrid
DYNA1I1	Cytoplasmic dynein 1 intermediate chain	Two hybrid
KRT15	Type 1 cytoskeletal keratin	Two hybrid
TRIM23	E3 ubiquitin-protein ligase	Two hybrid
GOLGA2	Member 2 Golgin (subfamily A)	Two hybrid

== Clinical significance ==
=== Cancer pathogenesis ===
FAM110A has been observed to be abnormally expressed in prostate cancer metastasis, where it co-localizes with E-cadherin and β-catenin at cell-cell adherens junctions, suggesting FAM110A’s involvement in the epithelial-to-mesenchymal transition in cancer pathogenesis. The greater FAM110 gene family is aberrantly methylated in breast cancer cells, and has been shown to be associated with reduced time to distant metastasis in breast cancer patients.

=== Cell cycle involvement ===
FAM110A has been found to localize to centrosomes and accumulate at the microtubule organizing center in interphase and at spindle poles in mitosis.
