= ERGIC2 =

Protein-coding gene in humans

Identifiers
- Aliases: ERGIC2, Erv41, PTX1, cd002, CDA14, ERGIC and golgi 2
- External IDs: OMIM: 612236; MGI: 1914706; GeneCards: ERGIC2

Gene location (Human)
Chr.	Chromosome 12 (human)
Band	12p11.22	Start	29,337,352 bp
Band	12p11.22	End	29,381,189 bp

Gene location (Mouse)
Chr.	Chromosome 6 (mouse)
Band	6|6 G3	Start	148,080,577 bp
Band	6|6 G3	End	148,113,872 bp
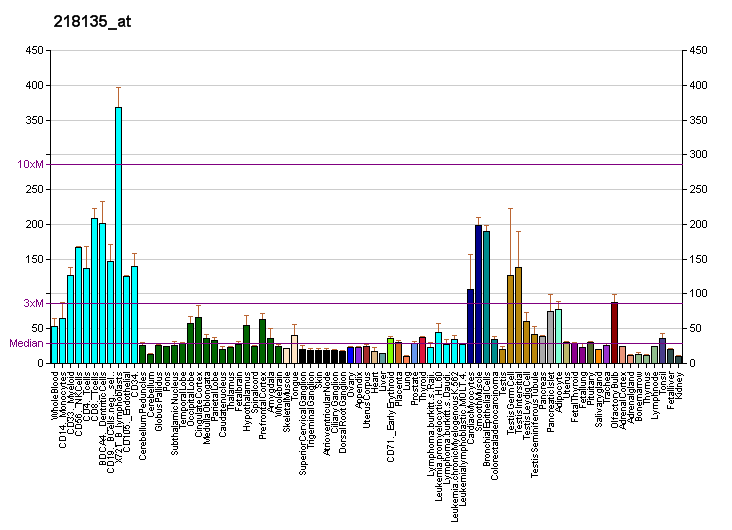
RNA expression pattern
Bgee	Human / Mouse (ortholog); Top expressed in: buccal mucosa cell; Achilles tendon; epithelium of colon; islet of Langerhans; germinal epithelium; stromal cell of endometrium; gingival epithelium; superficial temporal artery; oocyte; ventricular zone / Top expressed in: seminal vesicula; spermatid; spermatocyte; medullary collecting duct; secondary oocyte; ventricular zone; lacrimal gland; neural tube; tail of embryo; genital tubercle; More reference expression data
BioGPS	More reference expression data
Gene ontology
Molecular function	protein binding
Cellular component	cytoplasm; integral component of membrane; Golgi apparatus; nucleolus; endoplasmic reticulum membrane; membrane; endoplasmic reticulum-Golgi intermediate compartment membrane; nucleus; intracellular membrane-bounded organelle; endoplasmic reticulum; COPII-coated ER to Golgi transport vesicle; integral component of Golgi membrane; integral component of endoplasmic reticulum membrane
Biological process	vesicle-mediated transport; retrograde vesicle-mediated transport, Golgi to endoplasmic reticulum; transport; endoplasmic reticulum to Golgi vesicle-mediated transport
Sources:Amigo / QuickGO
Orthologs
Databases	NCBI: entry; OMA: entry
Species	Human	Mouse
Entrez	51290	67456
Ensembl	ENSG00000087502	ENSMUSG00000030304
UniProt	Q96RQ1	Q9CR89
RefSeq (mRNA)	NM_016570	NM_001286560; NM_026168; NM_026355
RefSeq (protein)	NP_057654	NP_001273489; NP_080444
Location (UCSC)	Chr 12: 29.34 – 29.38 Mb	Chr 6: 148.08 – 148.11 Mb
PubMed search
- Wikidata
View/Edit Human	View/Edit Mouse

Endoplasmic reticulum-Golgi intermediate compartment protein 2 (ERGIC2) is a gene located on human chromosome 12p11. It encodes a protein of 377 amino acid residues. ERGIC2 protein is also known as PTX1, CDA14 or Erv41.

== Function ==
The biological function of ERGIC2 protein is unknown, although it was initially identified as a candidate tumor suppressor of prostate cancer, and has been shown to induce cell growth arrest and senescence, to suppress colony formation in soft agar, and to decrease invasive potential of human prostate cancer cell line (PC-3 cells). It is now believed to be a chaperon molecule involved in protein trafficking between the endoplasmic reticulum-Golgi intermediate compartment (ERGIC) and Golgi.

== Structure and interactions ==
The protein contains two hydrophobic transmembrane domains that help anchoring the molecule on the ER membrane, such that its large luminal domain orients inside the ER lumen and both the N- and C-termini are facing the cytosol. ERGIC2 forms a complex with two other proteins, ERGIC3 and ERGIC32, resulting in a shuttle for protein trafficking between ER and Golgi. It has been shown to interact with a number of proteins, such as beta-amyloid, protein elongation factor 1alpha, and otoferlin. Therefore, it may play an important role in cellular functions besides of being a component of a protein trafficking shuttle. More recently, a variant transcript of ERGIC2 has been reported. It has a deletion of four bases at the junction of exons 8 and 9, resulting a frame-shift mutation after codon #189. The variant transcript encodes a truncated protein of 215 residues, which loses 45% of the luminal domain and the transmembrane domain near the C-terminus. This effectively abrogates its function as a protein transporter. A similar variant is also reported in armadillo. So this is not a random mutation. The function of this truncated protein is unknown.
