= ERGIC =

Transport organelle in eukaroytes

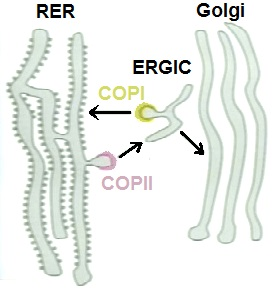
The ERGIC lies between the rough endoplasmic reticulum (RER) and Golgi on the secretory pathway

The endoplasmic-reticulum–Golgi intermediate compartment (ERGIC) is an organelle in eukaryotic cells. This compartment mediates transport between the endoplasmic reticulum (ER) and Golgi complex, facilitating the sorting of cargo. The cluster was first identified in 1988 using an antibody to the protein that has since been named ERGIC-53. It is also referred to as the vesicular-tubular cluster (VTC) or, originally, tubulo-vesicular compartment. Members of the ERGIC family include ERGIC1, ERGIC2, and ERGIC3.

In mammalian organisms, COPII vesicles that have budded from exit sites in the endoplasmic reticulum lose their coats and fuse to form the vesicular-tubular cluster (VTC). Retrieval (or retrograde) transport in COPI vesicles returns many of the lost ER resident proteins back to the endoplasmic reticulum. Forward (or anterograde) transport moves the VTC contents to the cis-Golgi network, the receiving face of the Golgi complex. This process is thought to occur by one of two processes. One is known as cisternal maturation where the VTC simply matures into the cis-Golgi network. In another, COPI vesicular transport moves VTC material to the receiving face of the Golgi apparatus through movement of the VTC along microtubules. Evidence exists for both processes and it may be that both occur simultaneously in cells.
