= Golgi reassembly-stacking protein 2 =

Protein found in humans

GORASP2

Identifiers
- Aliases: GORASP2, GOLPH6, GRASP55, GRS2, p59, golgi reassembly stacking protein 2
- External IDs: OMIM: 608693; MGI: 2135962; GeneCards: GORASP2
Available structures
PDB	Ortholog search: PDBe RCSB
PDB	List of PDB id codes 3RLE, 4EDJ

Gene location (Human)
Chr.	Chromosome 2 (human)
Band	2q31.1	Start	170,928,464 bp
Band	2q31.1	End	170,967,130 bp

Gene location (Mouse)
Chr.	Chromosome 2 (mouse)
Band	2|2 C2	Start	70,491,920 bp
Band	2|2 C2	End	70,542,980 bp
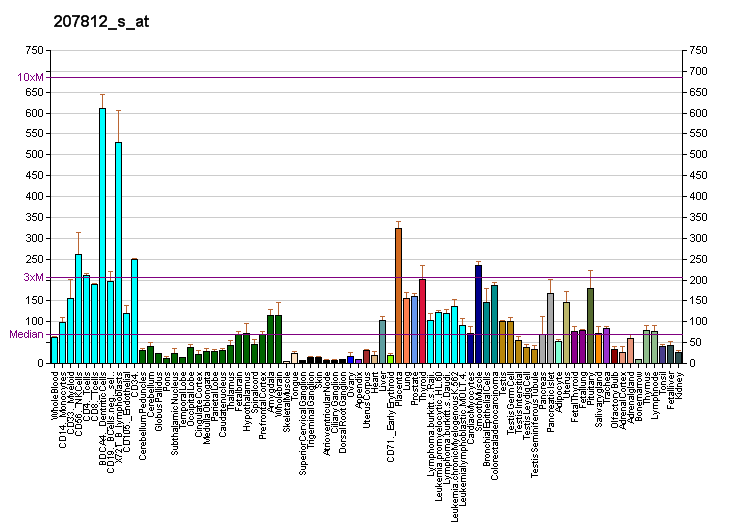

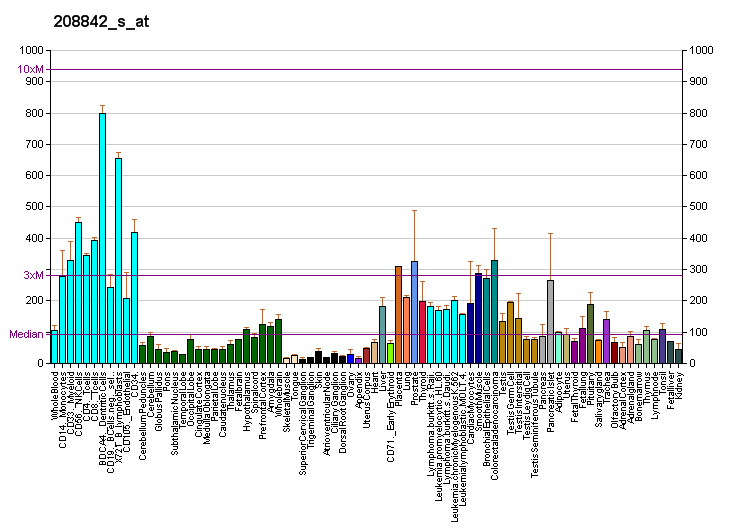

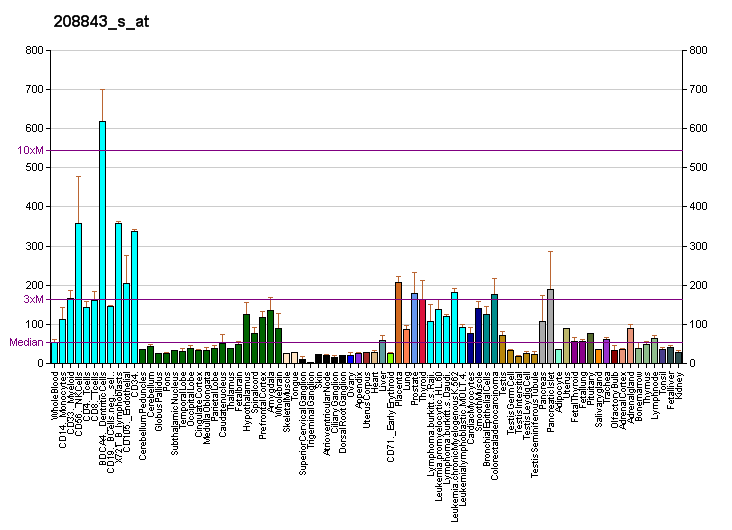
RNA expression pattern
Bgee	Human / Mouse (ortholog); Top expressed in: sperm; secondary oocyte; endothelial cell; tibia; parotid gland; islet of Langerhans; stromal cell of endometrium; cartilage tissue; corpus epididymis; palpebral conjunctiva / Top expressed in: Ileal epithelium; lacrimal gland; parotid gland; seminal vesicula; calvaria; crypt of lieberkuhn of small intestine; secondary oocyte; molar; islet of Langerhans; stroma of bone marrow; More reference expression data
BioGPS	More reference expression data
Gene ontology
Molecular function	protein binding
Cellular component	Golgi membrane; membrane; Golgi apparatus; endoplasmic reticulum; endoplasmic reticulum membrane
Biological process	organelle organization; Golgi organization; organelle assembly; spermatogenesis; cell differentiation; response to endoplasmic reticulum stress; establishment of protein localization to plasma membrane
Sources:Amigo / QuickGO
Orthologs
Databases	NCBI: entry; OMA: entry
Species	Human	Mouse
Entrez	26003	70231
Ensembl	ENSG00000115806	ENSMUSG00000014959
UniProt	Q9H8Y8	Q99JX3
RefSeq (mRNA)	NM_001201428; NM_015530	NM_027352
RefSeq (protein)	NP_001188357; NP_056345	NP_081628
Location (UCSC)	Chr 2: 170.93 – 170.97 Mb	Chr 2: 70.49 – 70.54 Mb
PubMed search
- Wikidata
View/Edit Human	View/Edit Mouse

Golgi reassembly-stacking protein 2 (GRS2) also known as Golgi reassembly-stacking protein of 55 kDa (GRASP55) is a protein that in humans is encoded by the GORASP2 gene. It was identified by its homology with GORASP1 and the protein's amino acid sequence was determined by analysis of a molecular clone of its complementary DNA. The first (N-terminus) 212 amino acid residues of GORASP2 are highly homologous to those of GORASP1, but the remainder of the 454 amino acid residues are highly diverged from GORASP1. The conserved region is known as the GRASP domain, and it is conserved among GRASPs of a wide variety of eukaryotes, but not plants. The C-terminus portion of the molecule is called the SPR domain (serine, proline-rich). GORASP2 is more closely related to homologues in other species, suggesting that GORASP2 is ancestral to GORASP1. GORASP2 is found associated with the medial and trans cisternae of the Golgi apparatus.

== Function ==
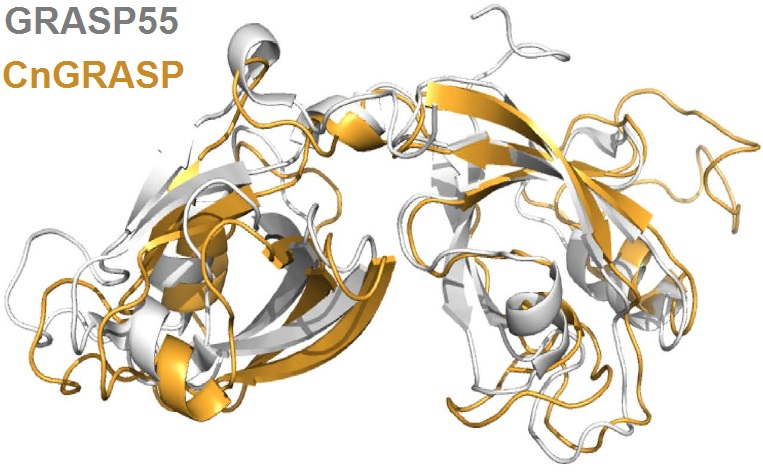
GRASP domain alignment of GORASP2 and the GRASP homologue of Cryptococcus neoformans

GORASP2 is involved in establishing the structure of the Golgi apparatus. It is a peripheral membrane protein located on the Golgi cisterna, and it can bind to another GRS2 located on an adjacent cisterna through the GRASP domain, thus linking the cisternae together through multiple protein–protein interactions.

GRS2 is attached to the membrane in two ways; it is myristylated, which attaches it directly to the lipid bilayer; it is also bound indirectly by binding to golgin-45, which binds to a Rab protein, which itself is lipidated and thus anchored to the membrane.

The structure of the Golgi is disrupted during mitosis, and phosphorylation of the SPR domains of GORASP2 and GORASP1 regulate that disruption, GORASP2 may also be involved in forming Golgi ribbons, but the evidence is mixed.

== Other interactions ==
GORASP2 has been shown to interact with TGF alpha, TMED2 and GOLGA2.
