= TMED =

TMED may refer to:

- Tetramethylethylenediamine, a chemical compound
- Telemedicine
- Transcendental Meditation, a form of silent, mantra meditation
- Transmembrane emp24 domain-containing protein, protein found in humans such as TMED1, etc.
