= RAB1B =

Protein-coding gene in the species Homo sapiens

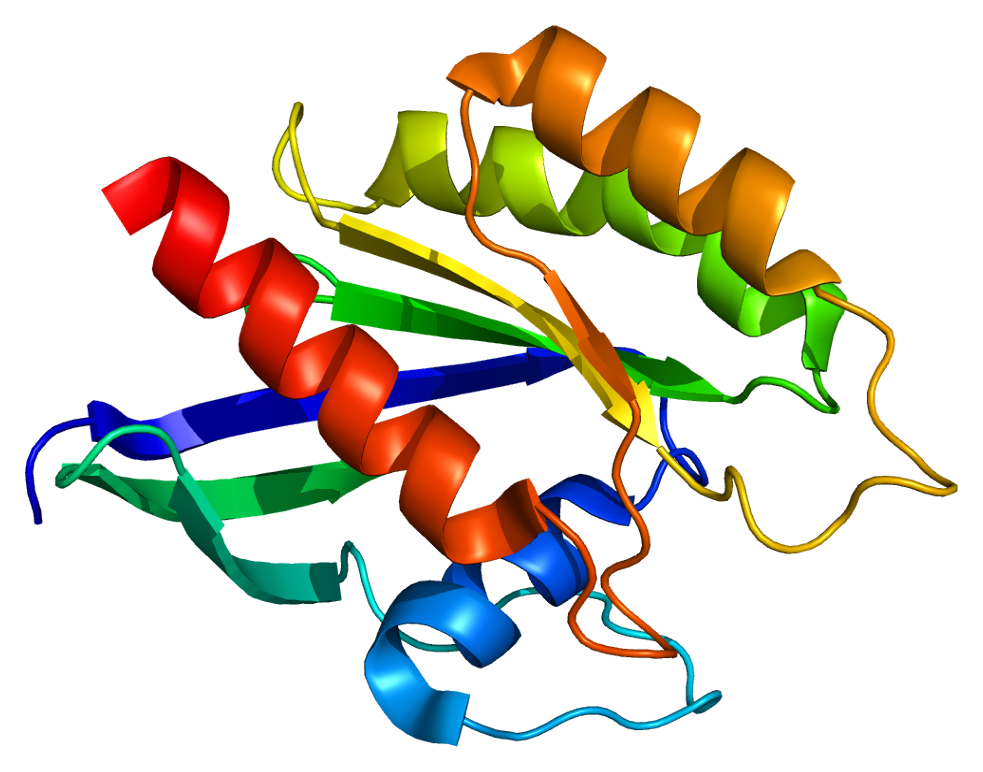

Identifiers
- Aliases: RAB1B, member RAS oncogene family
- External IDs: OMIM: 612565; MGI: 1923558; GeneCards: RAB1B
Available structures
PDB	Ortholog search: PDBe RCSB
PDB	List of PDB id codes 3JZA, 3NKV, 4HLQ, 4I1O
Enzyme activity
EC #	BRENDA	ExPASy	KEGG	MetaCyc
3.6.5.2	↗	↗	↗	↗

Gene location (Human)
Chr.	Chromosome 11 (human)
Band	11q13.2	Start	66,268,590 bp
Band	11q13.2	End	66,277,492 bp

Gene location (Mouse)
Chr.	Chromosome 19 (mouse)
Band	19|19 A	Start	5,149,233 bp
Band	19|19 A	End	5,157,100 bp
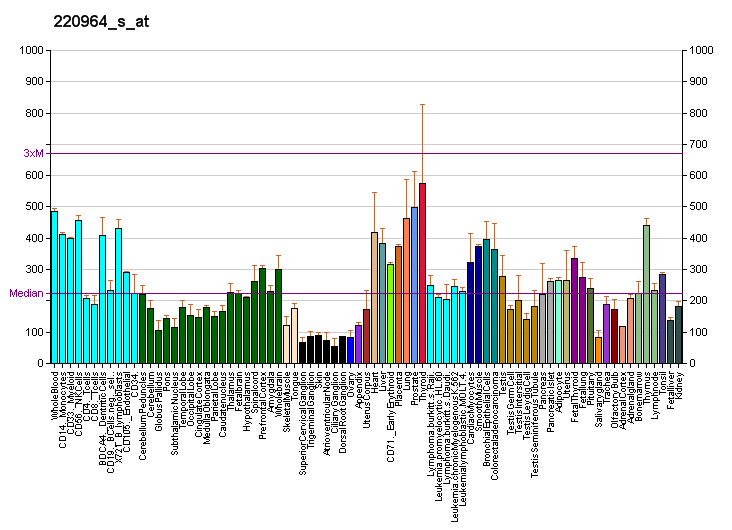
RNA expression pattern
Bgee	Human / Mouse (ortholog); Top expressed in: mucosa of transverse colon; apex of heart; skin of leg; body of stomach; gastrocnemius muscle; right adrenal gland; right coronary artery; right adrenal cortex; popliteal artery; left coronary artery / Top expressed in: lip; right kidney; granulocyte; muscle of thigh; yolk sac; dentate gyrus of hippocampal formation granule cell; ventricular zone; superior frontal gyrus; spermatocyte; primary visual cortex; More reference expression data
BioGPS	More reference expression data
Gene ontology
Molecular function	nucleotide binding; GTP binding; protein binding; GTPase activity
Cellular component	cytoplasm; phagophore assembly site membrane; Golgi apparatus; membrane; Golgi membrane; transport vesicle; mitochondrion; extracellular exosome; endoplasmic reticulum-Golgi intermediate compartment membrane; endoplasmic reticulum-Golgi intermediate compartment; endoplasmic reticulum membrane; cytosol; perinuclear region of cytoplasm
Biological process	establishment of endothelial intestinal barrier; positive regulation of glycoprotein metabolic process; autophagy; regulation of autophagosome assembly; endoplasmic reticulum to Golgi vesicle-mediated transport; COPII vesicle coating; protein transport; retrograde vesicle-mediated transport, Golgi to endoplasmic reticulum; post-translational protein modification; transport; intracellular protein transport; Rab protein signal transduction
Sources:Amigo / QuickGO
Orthologs
Databases	NCBI: entry; OMA: entry
Species	Human	Mouse
Entrez	81876	76308
Ensembl	ENSG00000174903	ENSMUSG00000024870
UniProt	Q9H0U4	Q9D1G1
RefSeq (mRNA)	NM_030981	NM_029576
RefSeq (protein)	NP_112243	NP_083852
Location (UCSC)	Chr 11: 66.27 – 66.28 Mb	Chr 19: 5.15 – 5.16 Mb
PubMed search
- Wikidata
View/Edit Human	View/Edit Mouse

Ras-related protein Rab-1B is a protein that in humans is encoded by the RAB1B gene.

== Interactions ==
RAB1B has been shown to interact with GOLGA2.
