= TGF alpha =

Protein

TGFA
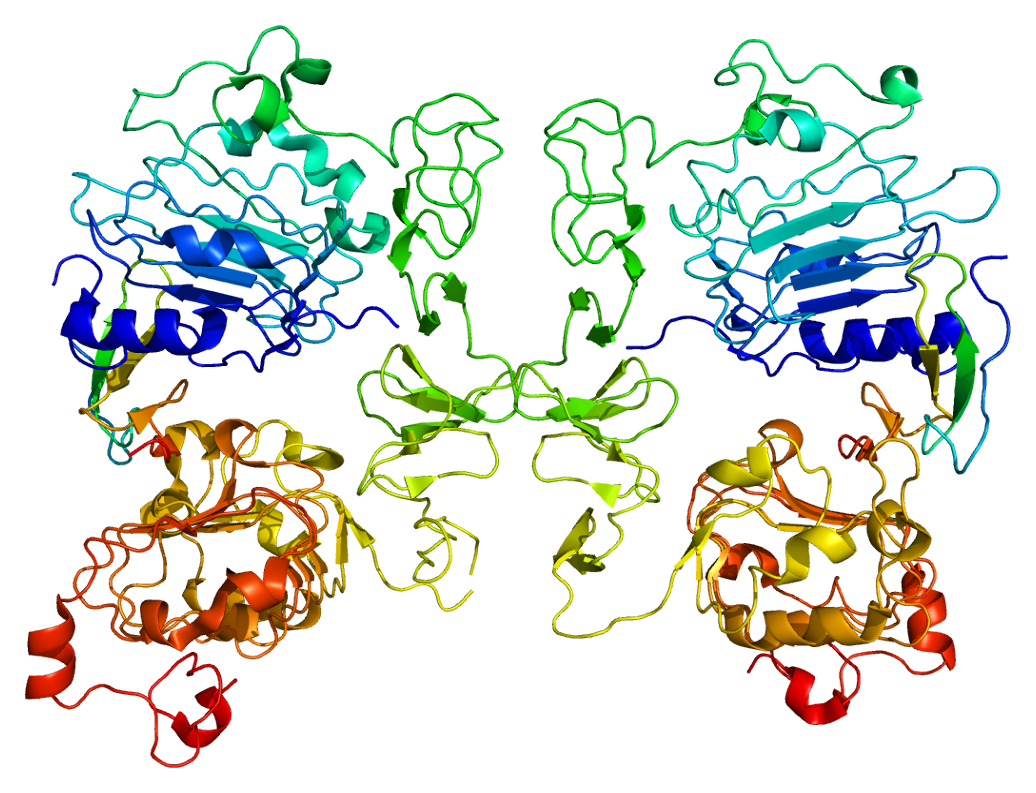

Identifiers
- Aliases: TGFA, TFGA, transforming growth factor alpha, Transforming growth factor - α
- External IDs: OMIM: 190170; MGI: 98724; GeneCards: TGFA
Available structures
PDB	Ortholog search: PDBe RCSB
PDB	List of PDB id codes 1GK5, 1MOX, 1YUF, 1YUG, 2TGF, 3E50, 3TGF, 4TGF

Gene location (Human)
Chr.	Chromosome 2 (human)
Band	2p13.3	Start	70,447,284 bp
Band	2p13.3	End	70,554,193 bp

Gene location (Mouse)
Chr.	Chromosome 6 (mouse)
Band	6 D1|6 37.62 cM	Start	86,172,205 bp
Band	6 D1|6 37.62 cM	End	86,252,701 bp
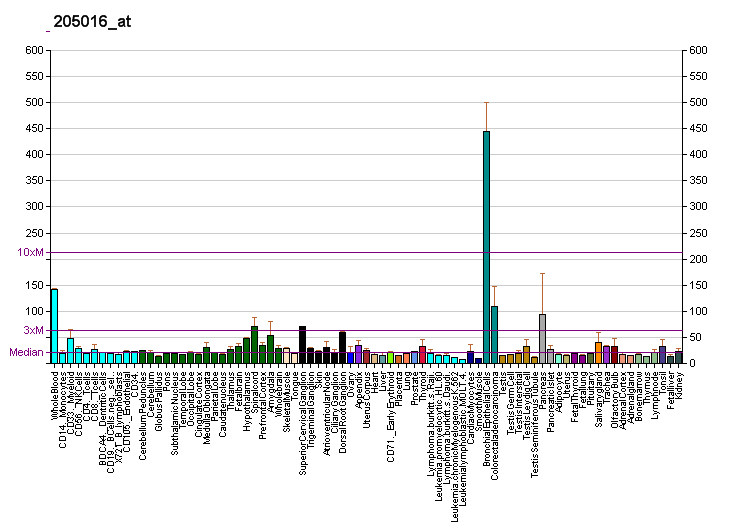

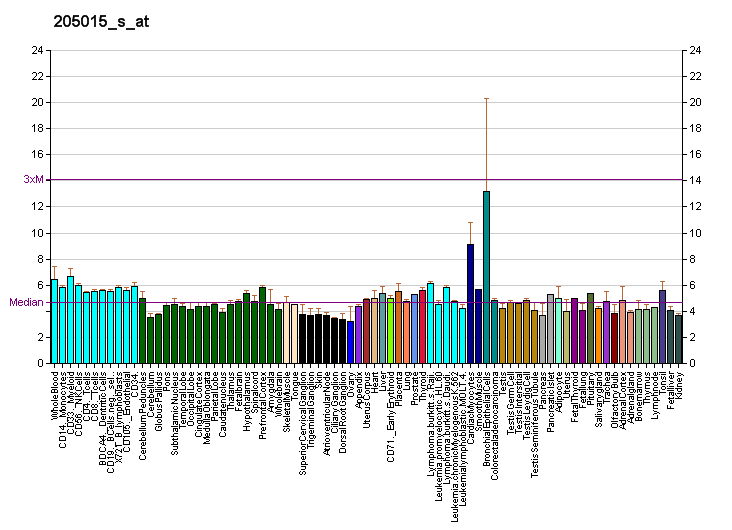

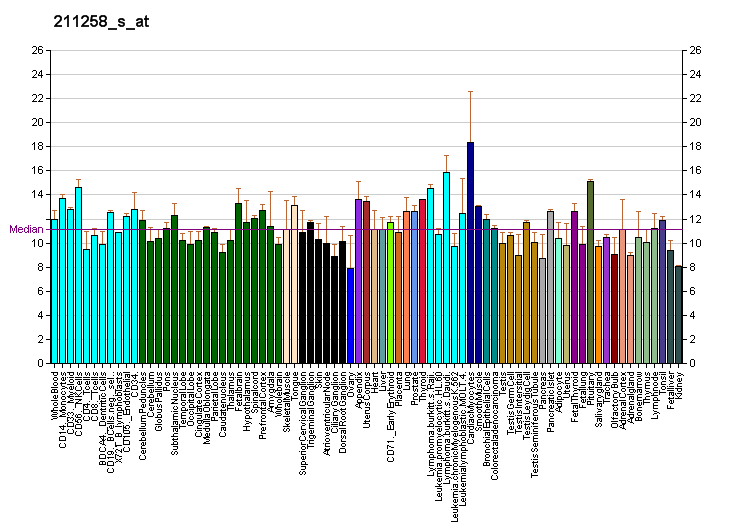
RNA expression pattern
Bgee	Human / Mouse (ortholog); Top expressed in: C1 segment; skin of thigh; pancreatic ductal cell; islet of Langerhans; amniotic fluid; testicle; epithelium of nasopharynx; buccal mucosa cell; nasal epithelium; corpus callosum / Top expressed in: transitional epithelium of urinary bladder; olfactory tubercle; decidua; lumbar subsegment of spinal cord; vestibular membrane of cochlear duct; lip; nucleus accumbens; umbilical cord; globus pallidus; suprachiasmatic nucleus; More reference expression data
BioGPS	More reference expression data
Gene ontology
Molecular function	epidermal growth factor receptor binding; protein binding; growth factor activity
Cellular component	integral component of membrane; endoplasmic reticulum membrane; membrane; plasma membrane; integral component of plasma membrane; extracellular region; cell surface; basolateral plasma membrane; perinuclear region of cytoplasm; ER to Golgi transport vesicle membrane; endoplasmic reticulum-Golgi intermediate compartment membrane; cytoplasmic vesicle; Golgi membrane; extracellular space; clathrin-coated vesicle membrane
Biological process	positive regulation of epidermal growth factor-activated receptor activity; positive regulation of epithelial cell proliferation; endoplasmic reticulum to Golgi vesicle-mediated transport; COPII vesicle coating; cell population proliferation; positive regulation of mitotic nuclear division; positive regulation of cell division; regulation of transcription by RNA polymerase II; epidermal growth factor receptor signaling pathway; positive regulation of cell population proliferation; MAPK cascade; signal transduction; negative regulation of epidermal growth factor receptor signaling pathway; positive regulation of protein kinase B signaling; membrane organization; intracellular signal transduction
Sources:Amigo / QuickGO
Orthologs
Databases	NCBI: entry; OMA: entry
Species	Human	Mouse
Entrez	7039	21802
Ensembl	ENSG00000163235	ENSMUSG00000029999
UniProt	P01135	P48030
RefSeq (mRNA)	NM_001099691; NM_001308158; NM_001308159; NM_003236	NM_031199
RefSeq (protein)	NP_001093161; NP_001295087; NP_001295088; NP_003227	NP_112476; NP_001390047
Location (UCSC)	Chr 2: 70.45 – 70.55 Mb	Chr 6: 86.17 – 86.25 Mb
PubMed search
- Wikidata
View/Edit Human	View/Edit Mouse

Transforming growth factor alpha (TGF-α) is a protein that in humans is encoded by the TGFA gene. As a member of the epidermal growth factor (EGF) family, TGF-α is a mitogenic polypeptide. The protein becomes activated when binding to receptors capable of protein kinase activity for cellular signaling.

TGF-α is a transforming growth factor that is a ligand for the epidermal growth factor receptor, which activates a signaling pathway for cell proliferation, differentiation and development. This protein may act as either a transmembrane-bound ligand or a soluble ligand. This gene has been associated with many types of cancers, and it may also be involved in some cases of cleft lip/palate.

== Synthesis ==
TGF-α is synthesized internally as part of a 160 (human) or 159 (rat) amino acid transmembrane precursor. The precursor is composed of an extracellular domain containing a hydrophobic transmembrane domain, 50 amino acids of TGF-α, and a 35-residue-long cytoplasmic domain. In its smallest form, TGF-α has six cysteines linked together via three disulfide bridges. Collectively, all members of the EGF/TGF-α family share this structure. The protein, however, is not directly related to TGF-β.

Limited success has resulted from attempts to synthesize of a reductant molecule to TGF-α that displays a similar biological profile.

=== Synthesis in the stomach ===
In the stomach, TGF-α is manufactured within the normal gastric mucosa. TGF-α has been shown to inhibit gastric acid secretion.

== Function ==
TGF-α can be produced in macrophages, brain cells, and keratinocytes. TGF-α induces epithelial development. Considering that TGF-α is a member of the EGF family, the biological actions of TGF-α and EGF are similar. For instance, TGF-α and EGF bind to the same receptor. When TGF-α binds to EGFR it can initiate multiple cell proliferation events. Cell proliferation events that involve TGF-α bound to EGFR include wound healing and embryogenesis. TGF-α is also involved in tumerogenesis and believed to promote angiogenesis.

TGF-α has also been shown to stimulate neural cell proliferation in the adult injured brain.

== Receptor ==
A 170-kDa glycosylated protein known as the EGF receptor binds to TGF-α allowing the polypeptide to function in various signaling pathways. The EGF receptor is characterized by having an extracellular domain that has numerous amino acid motifs. EGFR is essential for a single transmembrane domain, an intracellular domain (containing tyrosine kinase activity), and ligand recognition. As a membrane anchored-growth factor, TGF-α can be cleaved from an integral membrane glycoprotein via a protease. Soluble forms of TGF-α resulting from the cleavage have the capacity to activate EGFR. EGFR can be activated from a membrane-anchored growth factor as well.

When TGF-α binds to EGFR it dimerizes triggering phosphorylation of a protein-tyrosine kinase. The activity of protein-tyrosine kinase causes an autophosphorylation to occur among several tyrosine residues within EGFR, influencing activation and signaling of other proteins that interact in many signal transduction pathways.

Epidermal growth factor receptor (EGFR) signaling pathway upon binding to TGF-α.

== Animal studies ==
In an animal model of Parkinson's disease where dopaminergic neurons have been damaged by 6-hydroxydopamine, infusion of TGF-α into the brain caused an increase in the number of neuronal precursor cells. However TGF-α treatment did not result in neurogenesis of dopaminergic neurons.

== Human studies ==
=== Neuroendocrine system ===
The EGF/TGF-α family has been shown to regulate luteinizing hormone-releasing hormone (LHRH) through a glial-neuronal interactive process. Produced in hypothalamic astrocytes, TGF-α indirectly stimulates LHRH release through various intermediates. As a result, TGF-α is a physiological component essential to the initiation process of female puberty.

=== Suprachiasmatic nucleus ===
TGF-α has also been observed to be highly expressed in the suprachiasmatic nucleus (SCN) (5). This finding suggests a role for EGFR signaling in the regulation of CLOCK and circadian rhythms within the SCN. Similar studies have shown that when injected into the third ventricle TGF-α can suppress circadian locomotor behavior along with drinking or eating activities.

=== Tumors ===
This protein shows potential use as a prognostic biomarker in various tumors, like gastric carcinoma. or melanoma has been suggested. Elevated TGF-α is associated with Menetrier's disease, a precancerous condition of the stomach.

== Interactions ==
TGF alpha has been shown to interact with GORASP1 and GORASP2.

== See also ==
- Transforming growth factor
