= MCFD2 =

Protein-coding gene in humans

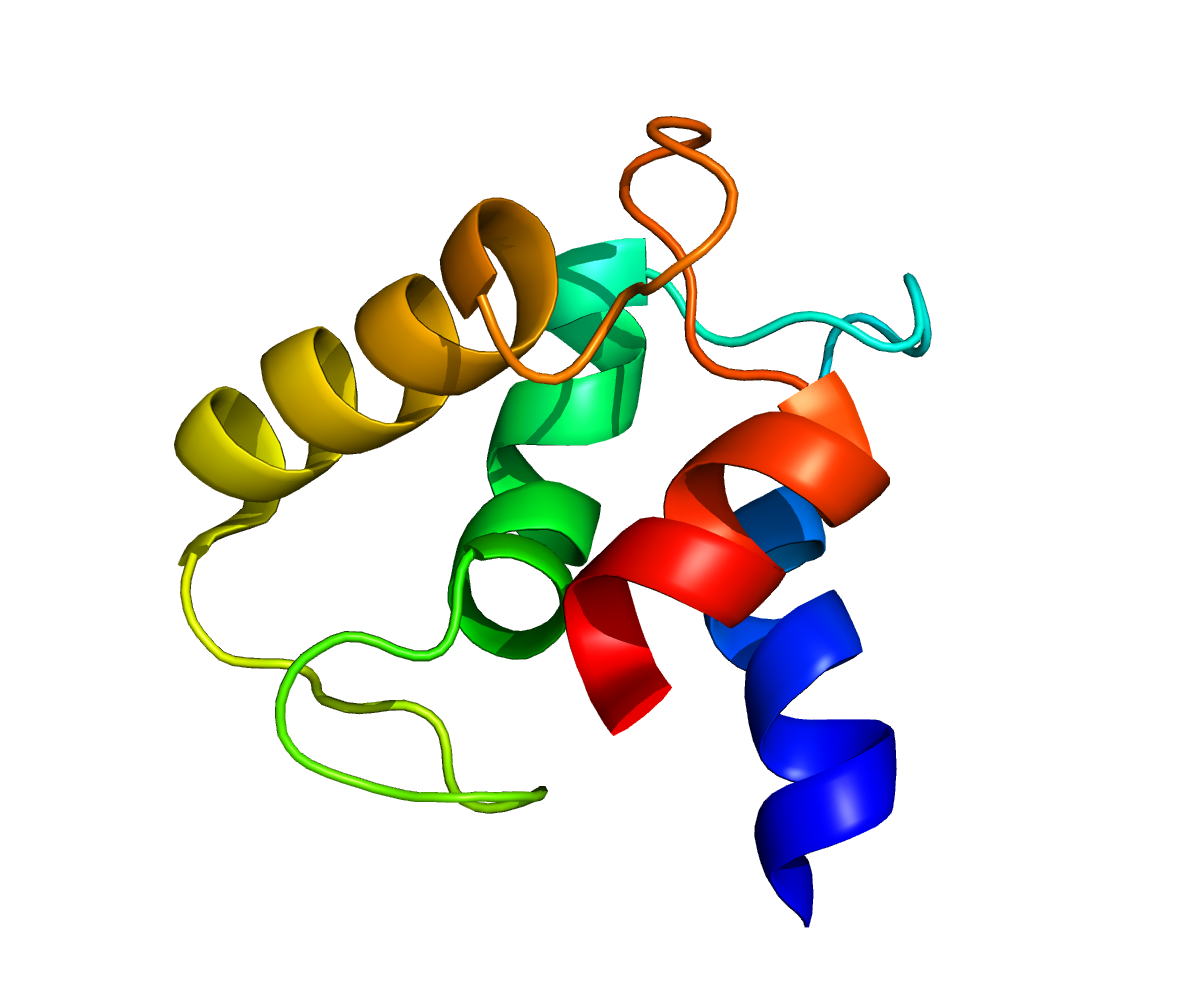

Identifiers
- Aliases: MCFD2, F5F8D, F5F8D2, LMAN1IP, SDNSF, multiple coagulation factor deficiency 2, multiple coagulation factor deficiency 2, ER cargo receptor complex subunit
- External IDs: OMIM: 607788; MGI: 2183439; GeneCards: MCFD2
Available structures
PDB	Ortholog search: PDBe RCSB
PDB	List of PDB id codes 2VRG, 3A4U, 3LCP, 3WHT, 3WHU, 3WNX, 4YGE, 4YGD, 4YGB, 4YGC

Gene location (Human)
Chr.	Chromosome 2 (human)
Band	2p21	Start	46,901,870 bp
Band	2p21	End	46,941,855 bp

Gene location (Mouse)
Chr.	Chromosome 17 (mouse)
Band	17|17 E4	Start	87,561,871 bp
Band	17|17 E4	End	87,573,363 bp
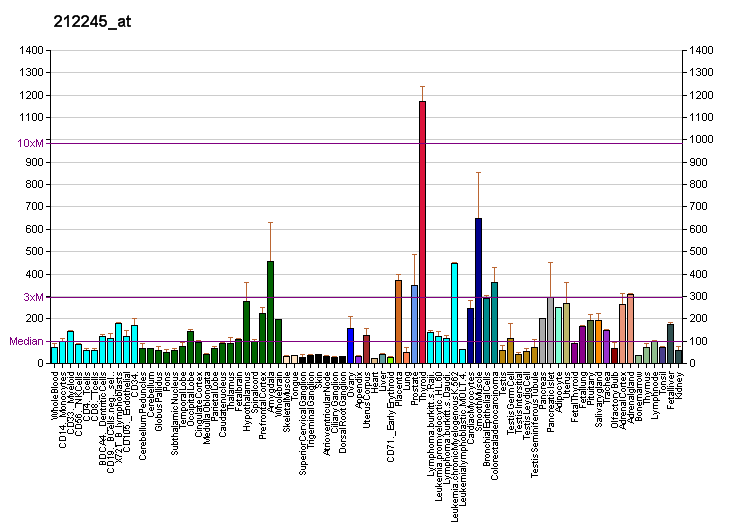

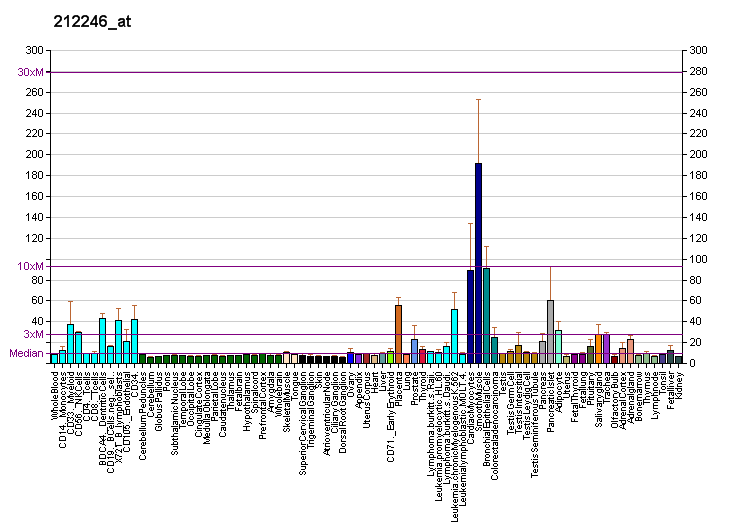
RNA expression pattern
Bgee	Human / Mouse (ortholog); Top expressed in: parotid gland; seminal vesicula; pericardium; stromal cell of endometrium; left adrenal gland; adrenal cortex; right adrenal gland; right adrenal cortex; left adrenal cortex; body of pancreas / Top expressed in: parotid gland; lacrimal gland; decidua; seminal vesicula; stroma of bone marrow; submandibular gland; gastrula; left lobe of liver; pyloric antrum; right kidney; More reference expression data
BioGPS	More reference expression data
Gene ontology
Molecular function	calcium ion binding; metal ion binding; protein binding
Cellular component	ER to Golgi transport vesicle membrane; Golgi apparatus; endoplasmic reticulum membrane; endoplasmic reticulum; endoplasmic reticulum-Golgi intermediate compartment membrane; endoplasmic reticulum-Golgi intermediate compartment; Golgi membrane
Biological process	protein transport; endoplasmic reticulum to Golgi vesicle-mediated transport; COPII vesicle coating; vesicle-mediated transport; protein N-linked glycosylation via asparagine
Sources:Amigo / QuickGO
Orthologs
Databases	NCBI: entry; OMA: entry
Species	Human	Mouse
Entrez	90411	193813
Ensembl	ENSG00000180398	ENSMUSG00000024150
UniProt	Q8NI22	Q8K5B2
RefSeq (mRNA)	NM_139279; NM_001171506; NM_001171507; NM_001171508; NM_001171509 NM_001171510; NM_001171511	NM_139295; NM_176808
RefSeq (protein)	NP_001164977; NP_001164978; NP_001164979; NP_001164980; NP_001164981 NP_001164982; NP_644808	NP_647456; NP_789778
Location (UCSC)	Chr 2: 46.9 – 46.94 Mb	Chr 17: 87.56 – 87.57 Mb
PubMed search
- Wikidata
View/Edit Human	View/Edit Mouse

Multiple coagulation factor deficiency protein 2 is a protein that in humans is encoded by the MCFD2 gene. Mutations in MCFD2 cause the combined deficiency of factor V and factor VIII (F5F8D), a recessive bleeding disorder. MCFD2 and ERGIC-53 (or LMAN1) form a protein complex and serve as a cargo receptor to transport FV and FVIII from the ER to the Golgi body. Mutations in LMAN1 gene (encoding ERGIC-53 or LMAN1) also cause F5F8D.
