= Golgin-45 =

Protein found in humans

BLZF1

Identifiers
- Aliases: BLZF1, GOLGIN-45, JEM-1, JEM-1s, JEM1, basic leucine zipper nuclear factor 1
- External IDs: OMIM: 608692; MGI: 1201607; GeneCards: BLZF1

Gene location (Human)
Chr.	Chromosome 1 (human)
Band	1q24.2	Start	169,367,970 bp
Band	1q24.2	End	169,396,540 bp

Gene location (Mouse)
Chr.	Chromosome 1 (mouse)
Band	1|1 H2.2	Start	164,117,369 bp
Band	1|1 H2.2	End	164,135,058 bp
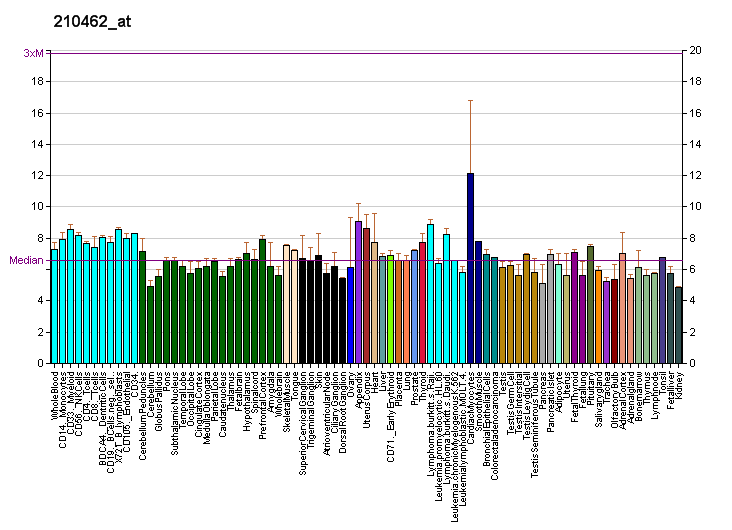

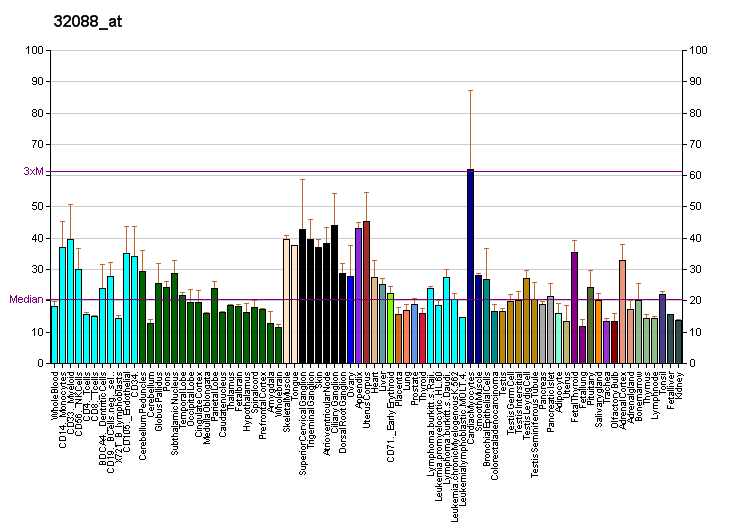

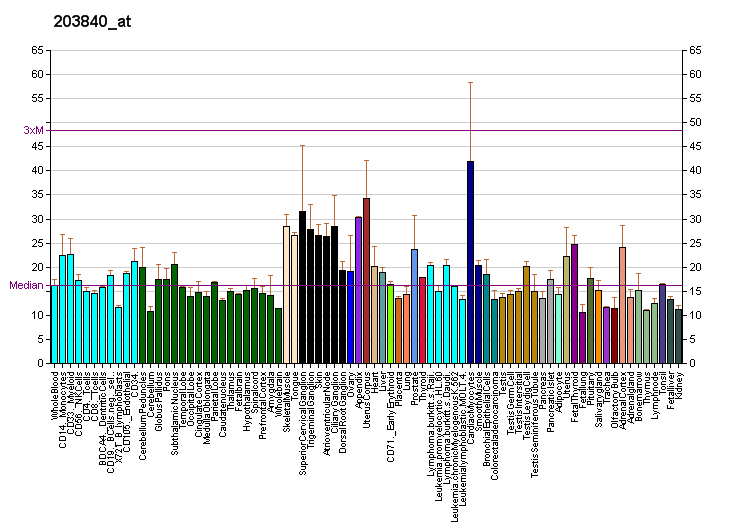
RNA expression pattern
Bgee	Human / Mouse (ortholog); Top expressed in: Achilles tendon; gonad; buccal mucosa cell; epithelium of colon; oral cavity; mucosa of esophagus; gallbladder; rectum; superficial temporal artery; islet of Langerhans / Top expressed in: lumbar spinal ganglion; zygote; secondary oocyte; esophagus; genital tubercle; muscle of thigh; cardiac muscle tissue of left ventricle; neural layer of retina; tail of embryo; spermatid; More reference expression data
BioGPS	More reference expression data
Gene ontology
Molecular function	DNA-binding transcription factor activity; enzyme binding; DNA binding; protein binding; ubiquitin protein ligase binding
Cellular component	cytoplasm; Golgi lumen; nucleus; Golgi apparatus; Golgi membrane; membrane; nucleoplasm
Biological process	regulation of transcription by RNA polymerase II; Golgi to plasma membrane protein transport; protein transport; cell population proliferation; Golgi organization; regulation of cell growth; vesicle-mediated transport; regulation of transcription, DNA-templated
Sources:Amigo / QuickGO
Orthologs
Databases	NCBI: entry; OMA: entry
Species	Human	Mouse
Entrez	8548	66352
Ensembl	ENSG00000117475	ENSMUSG00000026577
UniProt	Q9H2G9; Q5T532	Q8R2X8
RefSeq (mRNA)	NM_003666; NM_001320972; NM_001320973	NM_001160208; NM_001160209; NM_025505; NM_001357052
RefSeq (protein)	NP_001307901; NP_001307902; NP_003657	NP_001153680; NP_001153681; NP_079781; NP_001343981
Location (UCSC)	Chr 1: 169.37 – 169.4 Mb	Chr 1: 164.12 – 164.14 Mb
PubMed search
- Wikidata
View/Edit Human	View/Edit Mouse

Golgin-45 is a protein that in humans is encoded by the BLZF1 gene. Also called basic leucine zipper nuclear factor 1, this protein was originally predicted to function as a transcription factor due to a leucine zipper-like domain, but this has been called into question due to differences at conserved residues, and its apparent function in the golgi apparatus.

== Interactions ==
Golgin-45 has been shown to interact with GORASP2.
