= Transforming growth factor =

Biomarker indicative of breast cancer patients' prognosis

Transforming growth factor (or TGF) is used to describe two classes of polypeptide growth factors, TGFα and TGFβ.

The name transforming growth factor is somewhat arbitrary because the two classes of TGFs are not structurally or genetically related to one another, and they act through different receptor mechanisms. Furthermore, they do not always induce cellular transformation, and are not the only growth factors that induce cellular transformation.

== Types ==
- TGFα is upregulated in some human cancers. It is produced in macrophages, brain cells, and keratinocytes, and induces epithelial development. It belongs to the EGF family.
- TGFβ exists in three known subtypes in humans, TGFβ1, TGFβ2, and TGFβ3. These are upregulated in Marfan's syndrome and some human cancers, and play crucial roles in tissue regeneration, cell differentiation, embryonic development, and regulation of the immune system. Isoforms of transforming growth factor-beta (TGF-β1) are also thought to be involved in the pathogenesis of pre-eclampsia. They belong to the transforming growth factor beta family. TGFβ receptors are single pass serine/threonine kinase receptors.

== Function ==
These proteins were originally characterized by their capacity to induce oncogenic transformation in a specific cell culture system, rat kidney fibroblasts. Application of the transforming growth factors to normal rat kidney fibroblasts induces the cultured cells to proliferate and overgrow, no longer subject to the normal inhibition caused by contact between cells.

== See also ==
- Bone morphogenetic protein
- TGF beta signaling pathway
- Tubuloglomerular feedback
