= LMAN1 =

Protein-coding gene in the species Homo sapiens

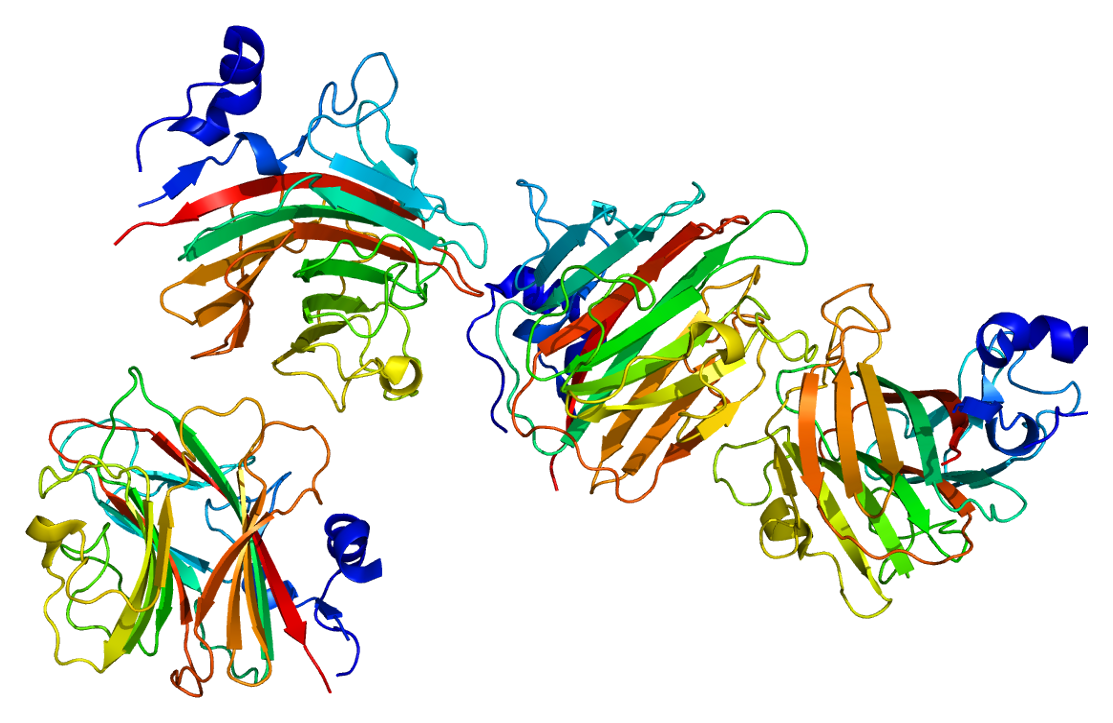
Available structures
| PDB | Ortholog search: PDBe RCSB |
| PDB | List of PDB id codes 3A4U, 3LCP, 3WHT, 3WHU, 3WNX, 4GKX, 4GKY, 4YGC, 4YGD, 4YGE, 4YGB |

Identifiers
- Aliases: LMAN1, ERGIC-53, ERGIC53, F5F8D, FMFD1, MCFD1, MR60, gp58, lectin, mannose binding 1
- External IDs: OMIM: 601567; MGI: 1917611; HomoloGene: 4070; GeneCards: LMAN1; OMA:LMAN1 - orthologs

Gene location (Human)
| Chr. | Chromosome 18 (human) |
| Band | 18q21.32 | Start | 59,327,823 bp |
| Band | 18q21.32 | End | 59,359,265 bp |

Gene location (Mouse)
| Chr. | Chromosome 18 (mouse) |
| Band | 18|18 E1 | Start | 66,113,809 bp |
| Band | 18|18 E1 | End | 66,155,651 bp |
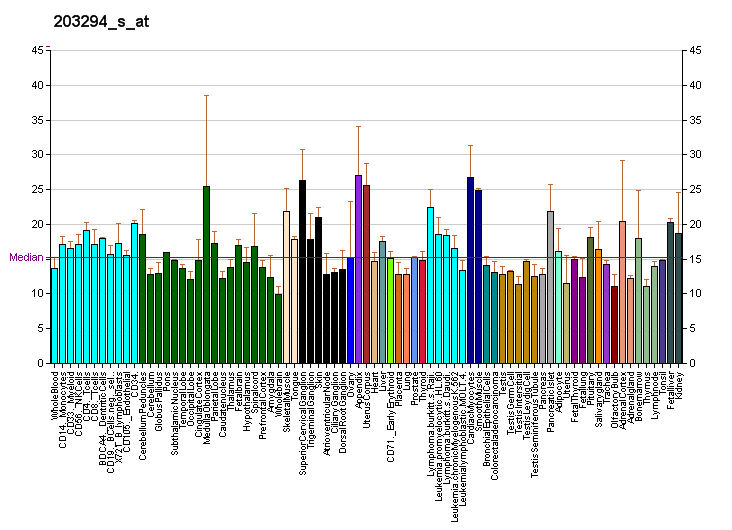

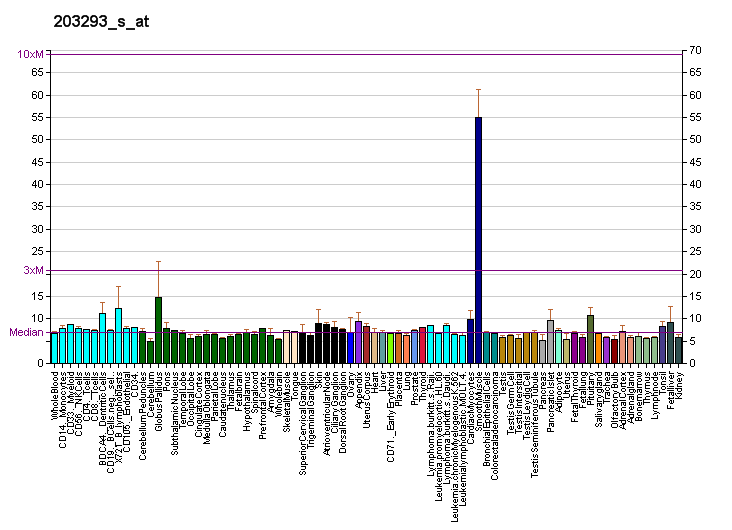
RNA expression pattern
| Bgee | Human / Mouse (ortholog); Top expressed in: germinal epithelium; jejunal mucosa; gingival epithelium; corpus epididymis; caput epididymis; epithelium of nasopharynx; secondary oocyte; tibia; cardia; seminal vesicula / Top expressed in: lacrimal gland; calvaria; salivary gland; islet of Langerhans; seminal vesicula; submandibular gland; retinal pigment epithelium; ciliary body; parotid gland; human fetus; More reference expression data |
| BioGPS | More reference expression data |
Gene ontology
| Molecular function | unfolded protein binding; metal ion binding; protein binding; mannose binding; carbohydrate binding |
| Cellular component | integral component of membrane; Golgi apparatus; Golgi membrane; sarcomere; host cell perinuclear region of cytoplasm; endoplasmic reticulum; ER to Golgi transport vesicle membrane; extracellular exosome; endoplasmic reticulum membrane; endoplasmic reticulum-Golgi intermediate compartment; membrane; endoplasmic reticulum-Golgi intermediate compartment membrane; COPII-coated ER to Golgi transport vesicle |
| Biological process | Golgi organization; early endosome to Golgi transport; blood coagulation; positive regulation of organelle organization; protein N-linked glycosylation via asparagine; COPII vesicle coating; protein exit from endoplasmic reticulum; protein folding; protein transport; vesicle-mediated transport; endoplasmic reticulum to Golgi vesicle-mediated transport; endoplasmic reticulum organization; transport |
Sources:Amigo / QuickGO
Orthologs
| Species | Human | Mouse |
| Entrez | 3998 | 70361 |
| Ensembl | ENSG00000074695 | ENSMUSG00000041891 |
| UniProt | P49257 | Q9D0F3 |
| RefSeq (mRNA) | NM_005570 | NM_001172062; NM_027400 |
| RefSeq (protein) | NP_005561 | NP_001165533; NP_081676 |
| Location (UCSC) | Chr 18: 59.33 – 59.36 Mb | Chr 18: 66.11 – 66.16 Mb |
| PubMed search |
- Wikidata
| View/Edit Human | View/Edit Mouse |

Protein ERGIC-53 also known as ER-Golgi intermediate compartment 53 kDa protein or lectin mannose-binding 1 is a protein that in humans is encoded by the LMAN1 gene.

== Function ==
ERGIC-53 (also named LMAN1) is a type I integral membrane protein localized in the intermediate region (ERGIC) between the endoplasmic reticulum and the Golgi, presumably recycling between the two compartments. The protein is a mannose-specific lectin and is a member of a novel family of plant lectin homologs in the secretory pathway of animal cells. Mutations in the gene are associated with a coagulation defect. Using positional cloning, the gene was identified as the disease gene leading to combined deficiency of factor V-factor VIII, a rare, autosomal recessive disorder in which both coagulation factors V and VIII are diminished. MCFD2 is the second gene that leads to combined deficiency of factor V-factor VIII. ERGIC-53 and MCFD2 form a protein complex and serve as a cargo receptor to transport FV and FVIII from the ER to the ERGIC and then the Golgi,as illustrated here.

== Clinical significance ==
LMAN1 mutational inactivation is a frequent and early event potentially contributing to colorectal tumorigenesis.
