= Golgi reassembly-stacking protein 1 =

Protein-coding gene in the species Homo sapiens

GORASP1
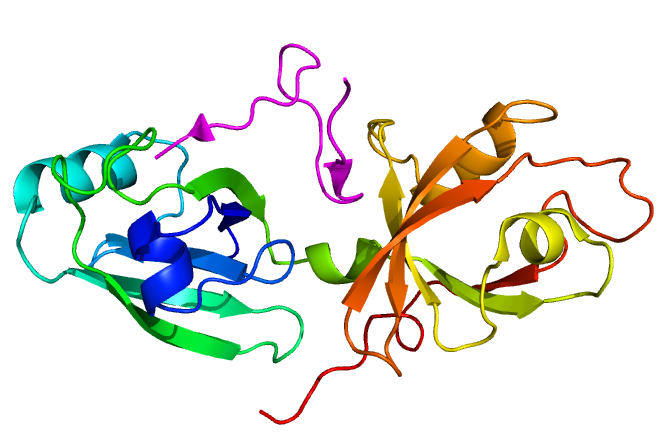
- Crystallographic structure of the Golgi reassembly-stacking protein GRASP65 (rainbow colored) and the Golgi matrix protein GM130 (magenta) based on PDB: 4REY

Identifiers
- Aliases: GORASP1, GOLPH5, GRASP65, P65, golgi reassembly stacking protein 1
- External IDs: OMIM: 606867; MGI: 1921748; GeneCards: GORASP1
Available structures
PDB	Ortholog search: PDBe RCSB
PDB	List of PDB id codes 4REY

Gene location (Human)
Chr.	Chromosome 3 (human)
Band	3p22.2	Start	39,095,222 bp
Band	3p22.2	End	39,108,369 bp

Gene location (Mouse)
Chr.	Chromosome 9 (mouse)
Band	9|9 F4	Start	119,754,323 bp
Band	9|9 F4	End	119,766,631 bp
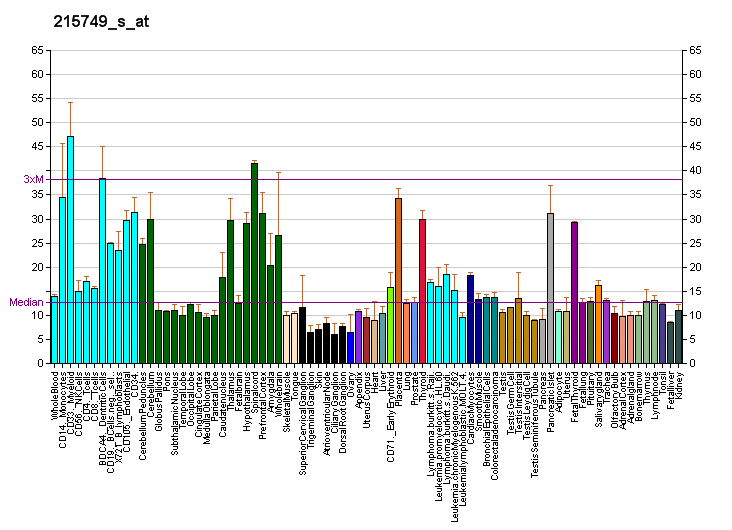
RNA expression pattern
Bgee	Human / Mouse (ortholog); Top expressed in: right lobe of thyroid gland; right uterine tube; transverse colon; minor salivary glands; body of pancreas; left lobe of thyroid gland; body of stomach; right lung; rectum; body of uterus / Top expressed in: yolk sac; transitional epithelium of urinary bladder; lacrimal gland; otic vesicle; saccule; parotid gland; right kidney; proximal tubule; interventricular septum; muscle of thigh; More reference expression data
BioGPS	More reference expression data
Gene ontology
Molecular function	protein binding; metal ion binding
Cellular component	Golgi membrane; Golgi apparatus; endoplasmic reticulum-Golgi intermediate compartment membrane; membrane
Biological process	protein transport; endoplasmic reticulum to Golgi vesicle-mediated transport; COPII vesicle coating; protein N-linked glycosylation; negative regulation of dendrite morphogenesis; Golgi organization; positive regulation of ubiquitin protein ligase activity; establishment of protein localization to plasma membrane
Sources:Amigo / QuickGO
Orthologs
Databases	NCBI: entry; OMA: entry
Species	Human	Mouse
Entrez	64689	74498
Ensembl	ENSG00000114745	ENSMUSG00000032513
UniProt	Q9BQQ3	Q91X51
RefSeq (mRNA)	NM_001278789; NM_001278790; NM_031899	NM_028976
RefSeq (protein)	NP_001265718; NP_001265719; NP_114105; NP_114105.1	NP_083252
Location (UCSC)	Chr 3: 39.1 – 39.11 Mb	Chr 9: 119.75 – 119.77 Mb
PubMed search
- Wikidata
View/Edit Human	View/Edit Mouse

Golgi reassembly-stacking protein 1 (GORASP1) also known as Golgi reassembly-stacking protein of 65 kDa (GRASP65) is a protein that in humans is encoded by the GORASP1 gene.

== Function ==
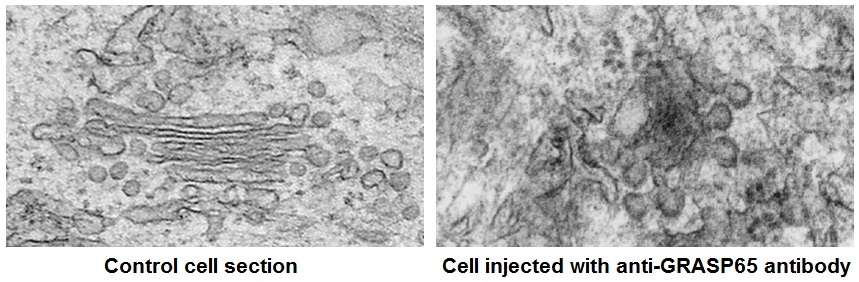
Microinjection of antibodies to GORASP1 prevents normal Golgi stack formation.

The Golgi complex plays a key role in the sorting and modification of proteins exported from the endoplasmic reticulum. The GORASP1 protein is a peripheral membrane protein anchored to the lipid bilayer through myristoylation of a glycine residue near the protein's amino terminus. It is involved in establishing the stacked structure of the Golgi apparatus and linking the stacks into larger ribbons in vertebrate cells. It is a caspase-3 substrate, and cleavage of this encoded protein contributes to Golgi fragmentation in apoptosis. GORASP1 can form a complex with the Golgi matrix protein GM130, and this complex binds to the vesicle docking protein p115. (Note: This is shown in the external link entitled "Molecular models of GRASP65/GM130/P115-mediated cis-cisternae membrane stacking and vesicle tethering.") Several alternatively spliced transcript variants of this gene have been identified, but their full-length natures have not been determined.

== Structure ==
GORASP1 contains two PDZ domains in the amino-terminal GRASP domain (amino acid residues 2–210), that comprises approximately half of the protein. The GRASP region interacts with the Golgi matrix protein GM130 as well as an intrinsically disordered region in the C-terminus.

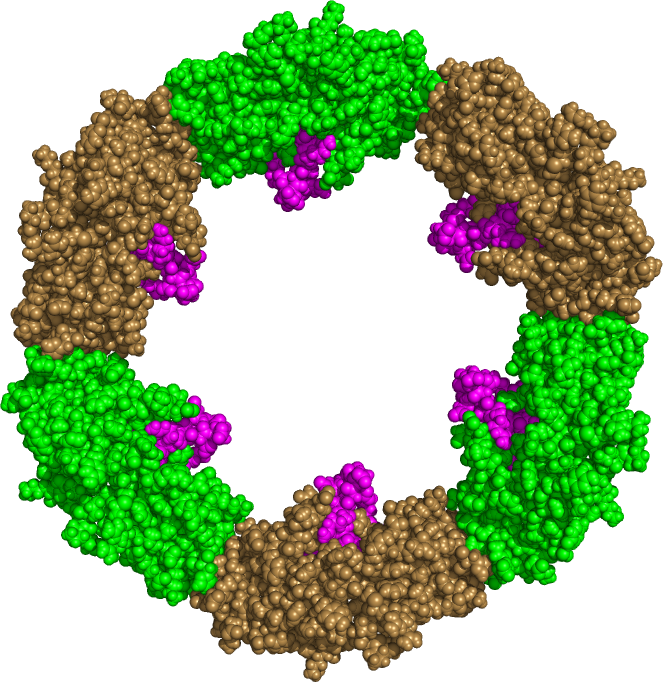
GRASP65 superhelix, topview

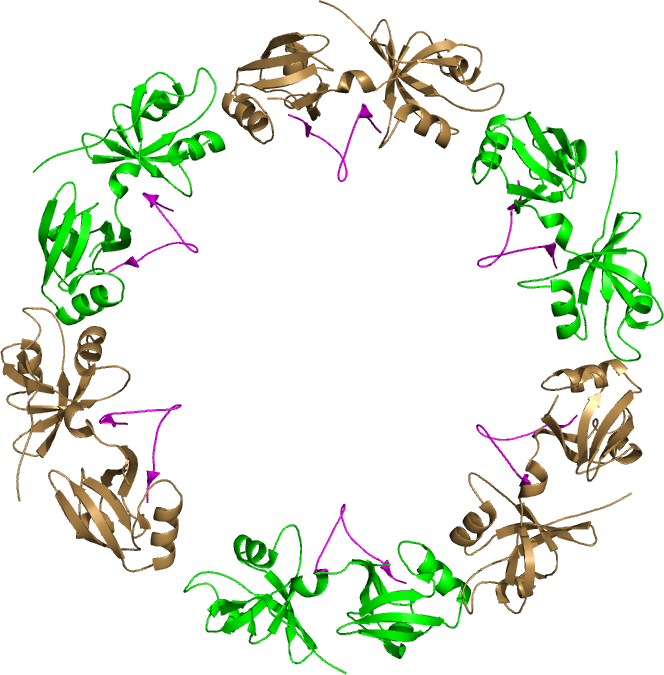

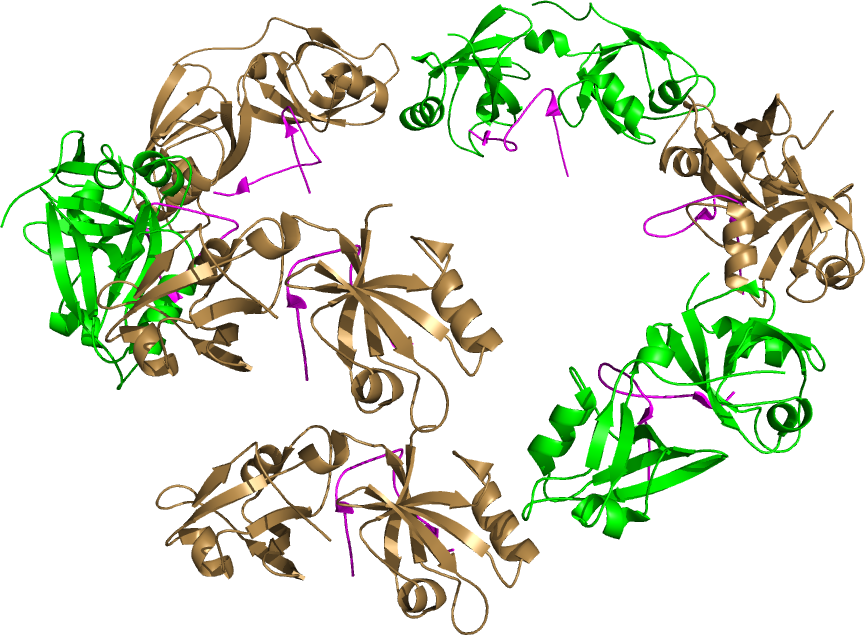
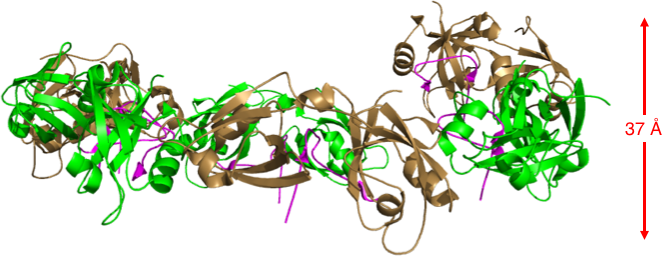
GRASP65 superhelix, side view

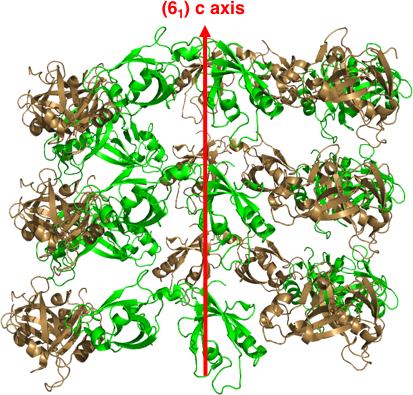

== Interactions ==
GORASP1 has been shown to interact with TGF alpha, TMED2 and GOLGA2.
