= TMED10 =

Protein-coding gene

Identifiers
- Aliases: TMED10, P24(DELTA), S31I125, S31III125, TMP21, Tmp-21-I, p23, p24d1, transmembrane p24 trafficking protein 10
- External IDs: OMIM: 605406; MGI: 3782198; GeneCards: TMED10

Gene location (Human)
Chr.	Chromosome 14 (human)
Band	14q24.3	Start	75,131,469 bp
Band	14q24.3	End	75,176,612 bp
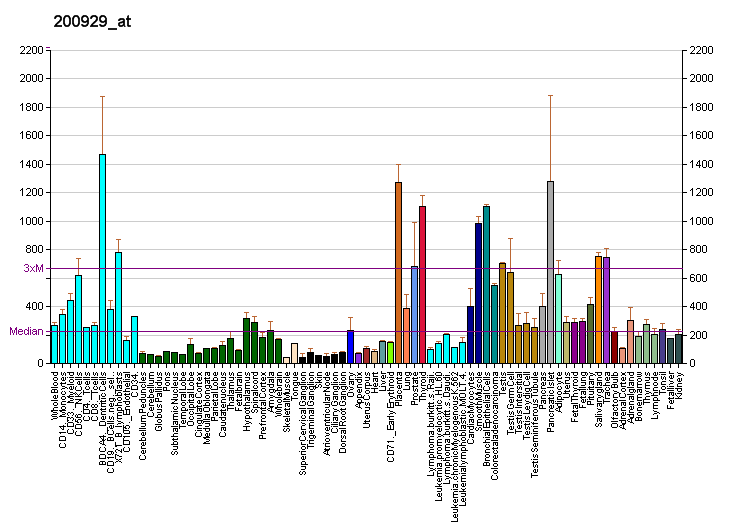

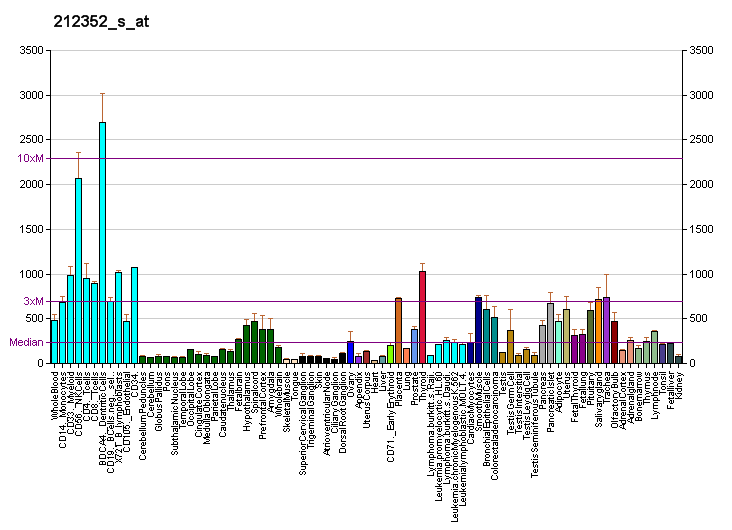
RNA expression pattern
Bgee	Human / Mouse (ortholog); Top expressed in: parotid gland; islet of Langerhans; stromal cell of endometrium; germinal epithelium; beta cell; corpus epididymis; caput epididymis; olfactory zone of nasal mucosa; mucosa of sigmoid colon; skin of thigh / n/a; More reference expression data
BioGPS	More reference expression data
Gene ontology
Molecular function	protein binding; syntaxin binding; protein-containing complex binding
Cellular component	integral component of membrane; Golgi apparatus; endoplasmic reticulum membrane; secretory granule membrane; membrane; intracellular membrane-bounded organelle; melanosome; Golgi membrane; cis-Golgi network; plasma membrane; transport vesicle membrane; transport vesicle; zymogen granule membrane; endoplasmic reticulum; ER to Golgi transport vesicle membrane; trans-Golgi network transport vesicle; endoplasmic reticulum-Golgi intermediate compartment membrane; gamma-secretase complex; cytoplasmic vesicle; COPI-coated vesicle; endoplasmic reticulum-Golgi intermediate compartment; COPII-coated ER to Golgi transport vesicle
Biological process	regulation of amyloid-beta formation; Golgi organization; kidney development; COPI coating of Golgi vesicle; vesicle targeting, to, from or within Golgi; COPI-coated vesicle budding; endoplasmic reticulum to Golgi vesicle-mediated transport; COPII vesicle coating; response to alkaloid; protein complex oligomerization; vesicle cargo loading; protein transport; regulated exocytosis; intracellular protein transport; vesicle-mediated transport; retrograde vesicle-mediated transport, Golgi to endoplasmic reticulum
Sources:Amigo / QuickGO
Orthologs
Databases	NCBI: entry; OMA: entry
Species	Human	Mouse
Entrez	10972	100042773
Ensembl	ENSG00000170348	ENSMUSG00000114251
UniProt	P49755	n/a
RefSeq (mRNA)	NM_006827	XM_036158265
RefSeq (protein)	NP_006818	n/a
Location (UCSC)	Chr 14: 75.13 – 75.18 Mb	n/a
PubMed search
- Wikidata
View/Edit Human	View/Edit Mouse

Transmembrane emp24 domain-containing protein 10 is a protein that in humans is encoded by the TMED10 gene.

This gene is a member of the EMP24/GP25L/p24 family and encodes a protein with a GOLD domain. This type I membrane protein is localized to the plasma membrane and golgi cisternae and is involved in vesicular protein trafficking. The protein is also a member of a heteromeric secretase complex and regulates the complex's gamma-secretase activity without affecting its epsilon-secretase activity. Mutations in this gene have been associated with early-onset familial Alzheimer's disease. This gene has a pseudogene on chromosome 8.
