= ERGIC3 =

Protein-coding gene in the species Homo sapiens

Identifiers
- Aliases: ERGIC3, C20orf47, CGI-54, Erv46, NY-BR-84, PRO0989, SDBCAG84, dJ477O4.2, ERGIC and golgi 3, C2orf47
- External IDs: OMIM: 616971; MGI: 1913616; GeneCards: ERGIC3

Gene location (Human)
Chr.	Chromosome 20 (human)
Band	20q11.22	Start	35,542,038 bp
Band	20q11.22	End	35,557,634 bp

Gene location (Mouse)
Chr.	Chromosome 2 (mouse)
Band	2 H1|2 77.32 cM	Start	155,849,965 bp
Band	2 H1|2 77.32 cM	End	155,860,199 bp
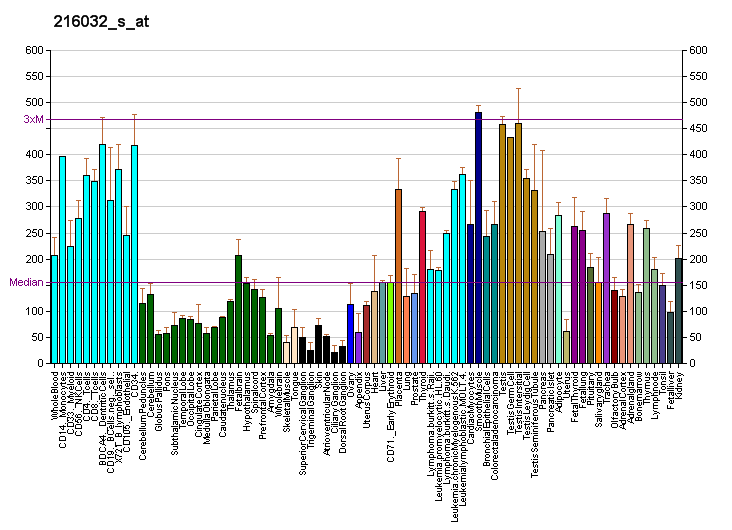
RNA expression pattern
Bgee	Human / Mouse (ortholog); Top expressed in: right uterine tube; right testis; left testis; stromal cell of endometrium; olfactory zone of nasal mucosa; right lobe of thyroid gland; left lobe of thyroid gland; canal of the cervix; mucosa of transverse colon; left ovary / Top expressed in: molar; neural layer of retina; yolk sac; choroid plexus of fourth ventricle; right kidney; dentate gyrus of hippocampal formation granule cell; external carotid artery; vestibular sensory epithelium; epithelium of lens; tail of embryo; More reference expression data
BioGPS	More reference expression data
Orthologs
Databases	NCBI: entry; OMA: entry
Species	Human	Mouse
Entrez	51614	66366
Ensembl	ENSG00000125991	ENSMUSG00000005881
UniProt	Q9Y282	Q9CQE7
RefSeq (mRNA)	NM_015966; NM_198398	NM_025516; NM_001356413; NM_001356414
RefSeq (protein)	NP_057050; NP_938408	NP_079792; NP_001343342; NP_001343343
Location (UCSC)	Chr 20: 35.54 – 35.56 Mb	Chr 2: 155.85 – 155.86 Mb
PubMed search
- Wikidata
View/Edit Human	View/Edit Mouse

Endoplasmic reticulum-Golgi intermediate compartment protein 3 is a protein that in humans is encoded by the ERGIC3 gene. It has been reported to be regulated by micro RNAs and may be important in a cancer.

It is a member of the endoplasmic reticulum-Golgi intermediate compartment (ERGIC) family.
