= Golgin subfamily A member 2 =

Protein-coding gene in the species Homo sapiens

GOLGA2

Identifiers
- Aliases: GOLGA2, GM130, golgin A2
- External IDs: OMIM: 602580; MGI: 2139395; GeneCards: GOLGA2
Available structures
PDB	Ortholog search: PDBe RCSB
PDB	List of PDB id codes 4REY

Gene location (Human)
Chr.	Chromosome 9 (human)
Band	9q34.11	Start	128,255,829 bp
Band	9q34.11	End	128,275,995 bp

Gene location (Mouse)
Chr.	Chromosome 2 (mouse)
Band	2|2 B	Start	32,177,396 bp
Band	2|2 B	End	32,197,933 bp
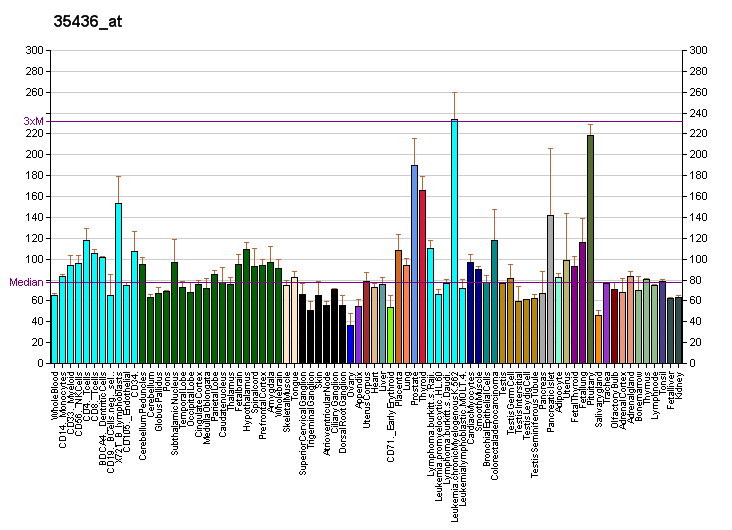

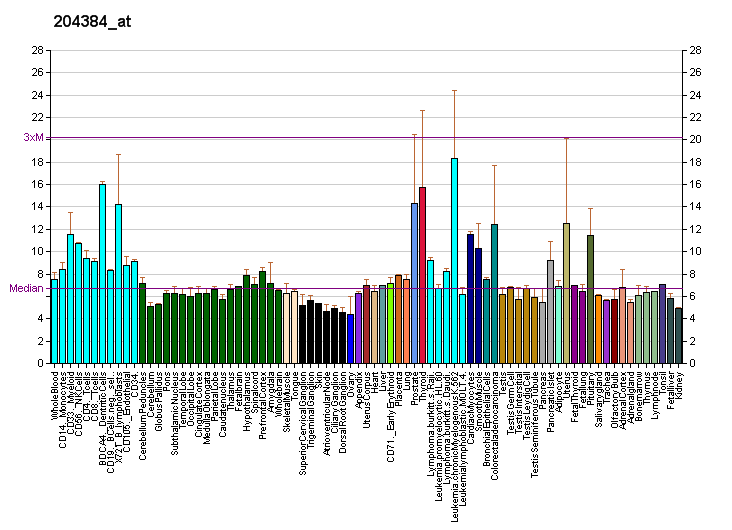

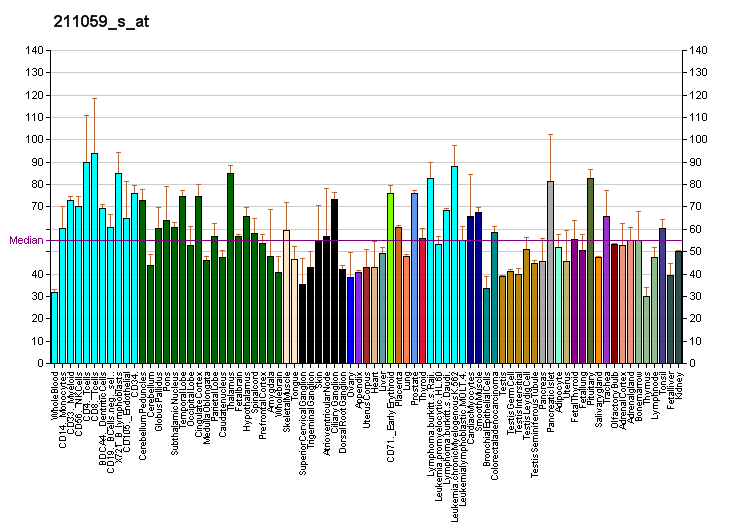
RNA expression pattern
Bgee	Human / Mouse (ortholog); Top expressed in: pituitary gland; anterior pituitary; stromal cell of endometrium; sural nerve; Achilles tendon; nipple; canal of the cervix; pylorus; cardia; ectocervix / Top expressed in: zygote; vestibular membrane of cochlear duct; secondary oocyte; internal carotid artery; lip; external carotid artery; primary oocyte; muscle of thigh; lacrimal gland; granulocyte; More reference expression data
BioGPS	More reference expression data
Gene ontology
Molecular function	microtubule binding; importin-alpha family protein binding; protein binding; syntaxin binding; protein kinase binding; cadherin binding; identical protein binding
Cellular component	cytoplasm; Golgi apparatus; spindle pole; membrane; Golgi membrane; cis-Golgi network; Golgi cis cisterna; Golgi cisterna membrane; COPII-coated ER to Golgi transport vesicle; mitotic spindle; microtubule; endoplasmic reticulum-Golgi intermediate compartment membrane; cytoskeleton
Biological process	positive regulation of protein glycosylation; negative regulation of protein binding; cell division; spindle assembly; protein glycosylation; endoplasmic reticulum to Golgi vesicle-mediated transport; mitotic spindle assembly; COPII vesicle coating; asymmetric cell division; cell cycle; Golgi disassembly; negative regulation of autophagy; protein homotetramerization; Golgi ribbon formation; microtubule nucleation; meiotic spindle assembly; positive regulation of ubiquitin protein ligase activity; centrosome cycle; Golgi organization; protein transport
Sources:Amigo / QuickGO
Orthologs
Databases	NCBI: entry; OMA: entry
Species	Human	Mouse
Entrez	2801	99412
Ensembl	ENSG00000167110	ENSMUSG00000002546
UniProt	Q08379	Q921M4
RefSeq (mRNA)	NM_004486; NM_001366244; NM_001366246	NM_001080968; NM_133852; NM_001362695; NM_001362696; NM_001362697 NM_001362698
RefSeq (protein)	NP_004477; NP_001353173; NP_001353175	NP_001074437; NP_598613; NP_001349624; NP_001349625; NP_001349626 NP_001349627
Location (UCSC)	Chr 9: 128.26 – 128.28 Mb	Chr 2: 32.18 – 32.2 Mb
PubMed search
- Wikidata
View/Edit Human	View/Edit Mouse

Golgin subfamily A member 2, also known as 130 kDa cis-Golgi matrix protein 1 (GM130) is a protein that in humans is encoded by the GOLGA2 gene.

== Function ==
The Golgi apparatus, which participates in glycosylation and transport of proteins and lipids in the secretory pathway, consists of a series of stacked cisternae (flattened membrane sacs). Interactions between the Golgi and microtubules are thought to be important for the reorganization of the Golgi after it fragments during mitosis. The golgins are a family of proteins, of which the protein encoded by this gene is a member, that are localized to the Golgi. This encoded protein has been postulated to play roles in the stacking of Golgi cisternae and in vesicular transport. Several alternatively spliced transcript variants of this gene have been described, but the full-length nature of these variants has not been determined.

A patient with a neuromuscular disorder has been identified that is homozygous for a deletion mutation in this gene, and morpholino knockdown in zebrafish has shown similar phenotypes.

== Interactions ==
GOLGA2 has been shown to interact with:

- GORASP1,
- GORASP2,
- RAB1A,
- RAB1B and
- RAB2A.
- WAC protein
