= ERGIC1 =

Protein-coding gene in the species Homo sapiens

Identifiers
- Aliases: ERGIC1, ERGIC-32, ERGIC32, NET24, endoplasmic reticulum-golgi intermediate compartment 1, AMCN, AMC2
- External IDs: OMIM: 617946; MGI: 1914708; GeneCards: ERGIC1

Gene location (Human)
Chr.	Chromosome 5 (human)
Band	5q35.1	Start	172,834,251 bp
Band	5q35.1	End	172,952,792 bp

Gene location (Mouse)
Chr.	Chromosome 17 (mouse)
Band	17|17 A3.3	Start	26,561,489 bp
Band	17|17 A3.3	End	26,656,934 bp
RNA expression pattern
Bgee	Human / Mouse (ortholog); Top expressed in: stromal cell of endometrium; right adrenal cortex; left adrenal cortex; mucosa of ileum; body of stomach; parotid gland; decidua; thoracic aorta; ascending aorta; Descending thoracic aorta / Top expressed in: ascending aorta; aortic valve; tail of embryo; lacrimal gland; genital tubercle; seminal vesicula; condyle; external carotid artery; salivary gland; transitional epithelium of urinary bladder; More reference expression data
BioGPS	n/a
Gene ontology
Molecular function	protein binding
Cellular component	integral component of membrane; Golgi membrane; Golgi apparatus; endoplasmic reticulum-Golgi intermediate compartment membrane; endoplasmic reticulum membrane; membrane; endoplasmic reticulum; endoplasmic reticulum-Golgi intermediate compartment; nucleoplasm; intracellular membrane-bounded organelle
Biological process	endoplasmic reticulum to Golgi vesicle-mediated transport; vesicle-mediated transport; transport; retrograde vesicle-mediated transport, Golgi to endoplasmic reticulum
Sources:Amigo / QuickGO
Orthologs
Databases	NCBI: entry; OMA: entry
Species	Human	Mouse
Entrez	57222	67458
Ensembl	ENSG00000113719	ENSMUSG00000001576
UniProt	Q969X5	Q9DC16
RefSeq (mRNA)	NM_001031711; NM_020462	NM_026170
RefSeq (protein)	NP_001026881	NP_080446
Location (UCSC)	Chr 5: 172.83 – 172.95 Mb	Chr 17: 26.56 – 26.66 Mb
PubMed search
- Wikidata
View/Edit Human	View/Edit Mouse

Endoplasmic reticulum-Golgi intermediate compartment protein 1 is a protein that in humans is encoded by the ERGIC1 gene.

ERGIC1 is thought to cycle between the endoplasmic reticulum (ER) and Golgi membranes and to participate in bidirectional secretory-pathway protein trafficking. The protein interacts with related ERGIC proteins and has been reported to promote their turnover. It is predicted to have a multi-pass membrane topology that is consistent its role in membrane organization and cargo transport.
