= TMED2 =

Protein-coding gene

Identifiers
- Aliases: TMED2, P24A, RNP24, p24, p24b1, p24beta1, transmembrane p24 trafficking protein 2
- External IDs: MGI: 3704329; GeneCards: TMED2

Gene location (Human)
Chr.	Chromosome 12 (human)
Band	12q24.31	Start	123,584,533 bp
Band	12q24.31	End	123,598,582 bp
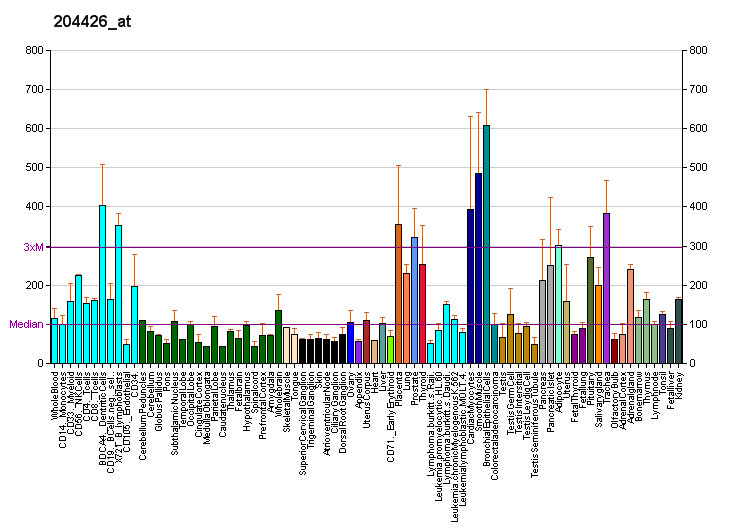

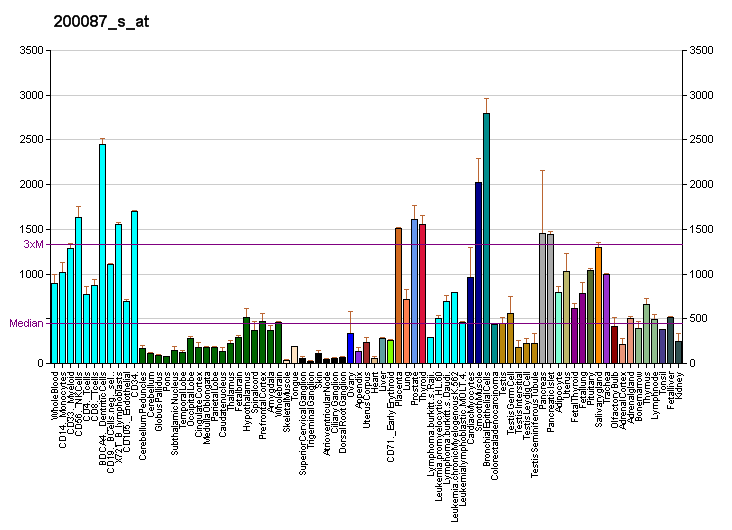

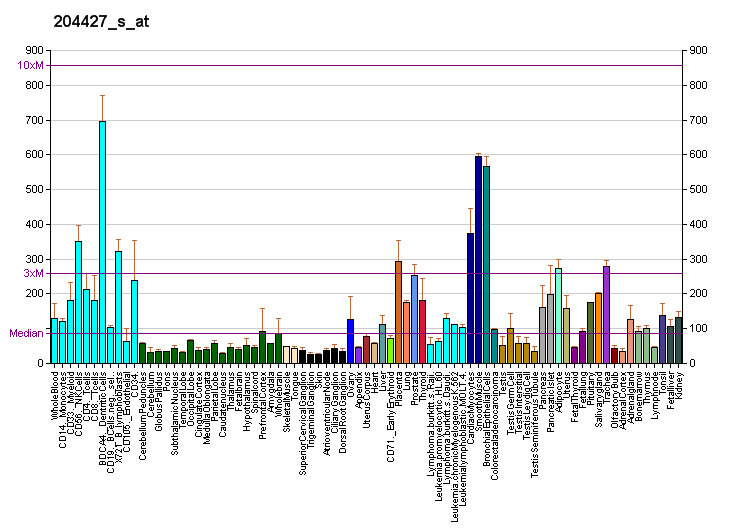
RNA expression pattern
Bgee	Human / Mouse (ortholog); Top expressed in: parotid gland; corpus epididymis; pylorus; pericardium; trachea; caput epididymis; cardia; human penis; superior surface of tongue; Epithelium of choroid plexus / n/a; More reference expression data
BioGPS	More reference expression data
Gene ontology
Molecular function	protein binding
Cellular component	transport vesicle; integral component of membrane; ER to Golgi transport vesicle membrane; Golgi apparatus; Golgi membrane; intracellular membrane-bounded organelle; Golgi cisterna membrane; zymogen granule membrane; membrane; endoplasmic reticulum; endoplasmic reticulum membrane; cytoplasmic vesicle membrane; cytoplasmic vesicle; COPI-coated vesicle; endoplasmic reticulum-Golgi intermediate compartment membrane; endoplasmic reticulum-Golgi intermediate compartment; COPI-coated vesicle membrane; COPII-coated ER to Golgi transport vesicle
Biological process	vesicle cargo loading; neural tube closure; maternal placenta development; embryonic placenta development; COPII vesicle coating; endoplasmic reticulum to Golgi vesicle-mediated transport; heart looping; positive regulation of gene expression; somitogenesis; Golgi organization; post-anal tail morphogenesis; embryonic morphogenesis; multicellular organism growth; in utero embryonic development; protein transport; negative regulation of GTPase activity; COPI coating of Golgi vesicle; labyrinthine layer blood vessel development; vesicle-mediated transport; somite rostral/caudal axis specification; intracellular protein transport; retrograde vesicle-mediated transport, Golgi to endoplasmic reticulum; protein localization to plasma membrane
Sources:Amigo / QuickGO
Orthologs
Databases	NCBI: entry; OMA: entry
Species	Human	Mouse
Entrez	10959	100862175
Ensembl	ENSG00000086598	n/a
UniProt	Q15363	Q9R0Q3
RefSeq (mRNA)	NM_006815; NM_001321445	XM_003945446
RefSeq (protein)	NP_001308374; NP_006806	NP_062744; NP_001390182; NP_001390186
Location (UCSC)	Chr 12: 123.58 – 123.6 Mb	n/a
PubMed search
- Wikidata
View/Edit Human	View/Edit Mouse

Transmembrane emp24 domain-containing protein 2 is a protein that in humans is encoded by the TMED2 gene.

== Interactions ==
TMED2 has been shown to interact with GORASP1 and GORASP2.
