= P24 protein family =

Identifiers
- Symbol: TMP21
- Pfam: PF01105
- InterPro: IPR015720
- Membranome: 140
Available protein structures:
- PDB: IPR015720 PF01105 (ECOD; PDBsum)
- AlphaFold: IPR015720; PF01105

P24 protein family is a group of transmembrane proteins that are major components of COPI and COPII-coated vesicles. The family is also known as EMP24/GP25L/p24 family and TMP21-like proteins. The latter naming was after transmembrane emp24 domain-containing protein 10 that was found in the human brain. It was claimed to block the beta-amyloid peptide, which is implicated in the pathogenesis of Alzheimer's disease.

== Function ==
p24 family proteins localize to the major organelles of the early secretory pathway: the endoplasmic reticulum and the Golgi apparatus, where they seem to be involved in trafficking between the two compartments. In yeast, all p24 family proteins can be removed, causing only a mild phenotype. However, in mammals at least some p24 proteins are essential for survival, e.g. removal of p24δ1 is lethal in mice. p24 family members have been implicated in the biogenesis of COPI and COPII-coated vesicles, transporting membrane-bound proteins through the secretory system, and forming the structure of the endoplasmic reticulum and Golgi.

== Distribution ==
Most p24 family proteins are widely expressed in various tissues. They are highly expressed in secretory cell types.

== Structure ==
p24 family proteins are type 1 transmembrane proteins with a single transmembrane domain. Most of the protein is in the lumen of the endoplasmic reticulum or Golgi save for a 13–20 amino acid cytosolic tail at the protein's C-terminus. The N-terminus has a GOLD domain (for "Golgi Dynamics") which may be involved in cargo recognition, followed by a coiled coil domain involved in the oligomerization of p24 family members. The cytosolic tail is involved in binding COPI and COPII proteins for sorting into vesicles within the secretory system.

== Evolution ==
p24 family proteins are divided based on their sequence into four families: called α, β, γ, and δ. Most vertebrates have three α family members, one β, five γ, and two δ; while yeast have three α, a β, three γ, and one δ. Plants have only the β and δ subfamilies.

== Family members ==
Vertebrates have three α family members: p24α1 (Erp1p in yeast), p24α2 (Erp5p), and p24α3 (Erp6p); one β member p24β1 (Emp24p in yeast); five γ members: p24γ1, p24γ2 (Erp2p in yeast), p24γ3 (Erp3p), p24γ4 (Erp4p), and p24γ5; and two δ members: p24δ1 (Erv25p in yeast) and p24δ2.

== History ==
p24 proteins were originally named based on their apparently molecular weight of around 24 kilodaltons, giving rise to names p23, p24, et al. As further family members were discovered, they were given names that fit the pattern – p26, p27, and p28 – even though they too were around 24 kilodaltons. In 1998, a more systematic nomenclature was proposed with all proteins called "p24", the Greek letter for their sub-family, and then numbered in the order of their discovery.
