= Elongation factor =

Proteins functioning in translation

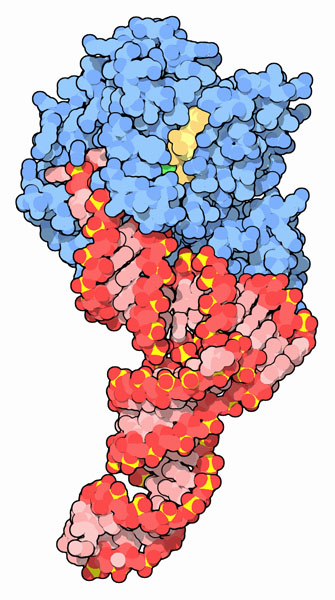
Ternary complex of EF-Tu (blue), tRNA (red) and GTP (yellow). Taken from PDB Molecule of the Month Elongation factors, September 2006.

Elongation factors are a set of proteins that function at the ribosome, during protein synthesis, to facilitate translational elongation from the formation of the first to the last peptide bond of a growing polypeptide. Most common elongation factors in prokaryotes are EF-Tu, EF-Ts, EF-G. Bacteria and eukaryotes use elongation factors that are largely homologous to each other, but with distinct structures and different research nomenclatures.

Elongation is the most rapid step in translation. In bacteria, it proceeds at a rate of 15 to 20 amino acids added per second (about 45-60 nucleotides per second). In eukaryotes the rate is about two amino acids per second (about 6 nucleotides read per second). Elongation factors play a role in orchestrating the events of this process, and in ensuring the high accuracy translation at these speeds.

== Nomenclature of homologous EFs ==
Elongation factors
Bacterial	Eukaryotic/Archaeal	Function
EF-Tu	eEF-1A (α)	mediates the entry of the aminoacyl tRNA into a free site of the ribosome.
EF-Ts	eEF-1B (βγ)	serves as the guanine nucleotide exchange factor for EF-Tu, catalyzing the release of GDP from EF-Tu.
EF-G	eEF-2	catalyzes the translocation of the tRNA and mRNA down the ribosome at the end of each round of polypeptide elongation. Causes large conformation changes.
EF-P	eIF-5A	possibly stimulates formation of peptide bonds and resolves stalls.
EF-4	(None)	Proofreading
Note that EIF5A, the archaeal and eukaryotic homolog to EF-P, was named as an initiation factor but now considered an elongation factor as well.

In addition to their cytoplasmic machinery, eukaryotic mitochondria and plastids have their own translation machinery, each with their own set of bacterial-type elongation factors. In humans, they include TUFM, TSFM, GFM1, GFM2, GUF1; the nominal release factor MTRFR may also play a role in elongation.

In bacteria, selenocysteinyl-tRNA requires a special elongation factor SelB (P14081) related to EF-Tu. A few homologs are also found in archaea, but the functions are unknown.

== As a target ==
Elongation factors are targets for the toxins of some pathogens. For instance, Corynebacterium diphtheriae produces diphtheria toxin, which alters protein function in the host by inactivating elongation factor (EF-2). This results in the pathology and symptoms associated with diphtheria. Likewise, Pseudomonas aeruginosa exotoxin A inactivates EF-2.
