= Yoshito Kaziro =

Japanese Scientist

Yoshito Kaziro (April 18, 1929 – June 29, 2011) was a Japanese biochemical and medical scientist who performed research on the effects and mechanisms of ATP and GTP driven conformational changes in enzymes and intracellular signaling pathways for over 50 years. He is well-known for his research on various signal transduction pathways involving GTP-binding proteins and the mechanism for biotin dependent carboxylation reactions of Coenzyme A (CoA) proteins.

== Personal life ==
Kaziro was born on April 18, 1929, in Okayama, Japan. He is the son of Nobuyo Kaziro and Kozo Kaziro, a famous researcher of hemoglobin. On August 5, 1950, he married Kuniko Ohkoshi Kaziro. Kaziro and his wife had two children, Shoko Kaziro, his first born named after his research on crystallizing biotin dependent propionyl-CoA carboxylase, and Hisako Kaziro. Over the course of Kaziro's career, he served as a researcher, mentor, and professor while always expressing a warm personality to his peers and students. In 1959, he became friends with Severo Ochoa, a Nobel Laureate known for his research on RNA synthesis and the genetic code, and worked in his laboratory. After his work involving ATP’s role in the propionyl carboxylase reaction, he became a good friend of Fritz Lipmann, a Nobel Laureate known for his research on ATP and acetyl-CoA. Although Japan did not have the best laboratory facilities at the time of his research, Kaziro worked to increase Japan’s presence in the field by contributing to world advancements in science and medicine. In 1983, Kaziro faced one of the most difficult challenges in his life when his wife died from cancer, who was integral in supporting his research. After a battle with malignant lymphoma, Kaziro died on June 29, 2011.

== Education and career ==
In March 1949, Kaziro graduated from 6th High School with an emphasis in natural science. Afterwards, Kaziro attended the University of Tokyo, graduating in March 1954 from the Faculty of Medicine. Afterwards, Kaziro received an internship at the University Hospital at the University of Tokyo. He completed his internship in March 1955 and received his M.D. from the Faculty of Medicine at the University of Tokyo in June 1955. Kaziro enrolled in graduate courses at the University of Tokyo in 2nd basic medical research and biological research. In June 1959, Kaziro graduated from his graduate studies at the University of Tokyo and was awarded a PhD.

Kaziro took an International Postdoctoral Fellowship opportunity from the U.S. Public Health Service that brought him to conduct research with Professor Severo Ochoa at the Department of Biochemistry at New York University Medical Center. In September 1960, he became a research associate in Ochoa’s laboratory. Kaziro and Ochoa studied the mechanism of carbon dioxide fixation involved with the carboxylation of CoA proteins for three years. Kaziro and Ochoa’s research proposed the steps of a mechanism for the propionyl carboxylase reaction involving the exchange of ATP and ADP. Their combined work was later cited in the textbook “The Enzyme” by Malcolm Dixon, published in 1964.

In December 1963, Kaziro returned to Japan and became an assistant professor performing research with the Faculty of Medicine at the University of Tokyo. After three years serving as an assistant professor, Kaziro was promoted to an associate professor at the Institute of Infectious Diseases at the University of Tokyo in December 1966. During the spring of 1967, the Institute of Medical Science at The University of Tokyo (IMSUT) was founded, and Kaziro was promoted to a professor at IMSUT in April 1967. During his research at IMSUT, Kaziro focused on GTP mechanisms and proposed signaling pathways involved with GTP-binding proteins. He researched the role of GTP in the translocation of proteins through a ribosome, the characterization of G nucleotide binding protein complexes, and the role the GTP hydrolysis in protein mechanisms. His research on the conformational change of proteins resulting from the energy release of GTP hydrolysis was extended to subsequent research on intracellular signal transduction and became widely accepted among world-wide researchers.

In 1975, Kaziro attended a symposium celebrating Severo Ochoa’s 70 years anniversary. At the symposium he met Dr. Arthur Kornberg from Stanford University, introducing him to many of his colleagues. Kaziro and his colleagues began to develop a friendship with Arthur Kornberg and researchers at the Stanford Biochemistry Department, leading Kaziro to consider California his second homeland in the world of biotechnology.

In March 1990, Kaziro retired from the University of Tokyo and headed to Stanford University to continue his research. In April 1990, Kaziro joined the DNAX Research Institute of Molecular and Cellular Biology and was appointed as the counseling professor of the Department of Chemistry at Stanford University in Palo Alto, California.

In 1993, Kaziro returned to Japan and founded a new laboratory at the Faculty of Bioscience and Biotechnology called the Tokyo Institute of Technology (TIT). During his time at the TIT, Kaziro conducted research on the differential display of mRNA which came to be a well-known technique used to identify which genes use G protein signaling to regulate their activation. Additionally, Kaziro conducted research on a human homologue of apoptosis-associated tyrosine kinase (AATYK) and identified isoforms that are novel Cdk5/p35-bnding proteins involved with the cell cycle progression.

In April 2000, Kaziro retired from the TIT and became the Vice President of Sanyo Gakuen University, located in his birth town of Okayama, Japan. He served as a professor at Santo Gakuen University for three years before being appointed to a professor at Kyoto University in April 2003. At Kyoto University, Kaziro served as the director of the new Horizontal Medical Research Organization (HMRO) at the university’s Graduate School of Medicine. In 2007, Kaziro became a mentor for the Career-Path Promotion Unit for Young Life Scientists (CPLS) at Kyoto University. Kaziro ended his career by taking the position of President at Sanyo Gakuen University.

== Research ==
Kaziro is most well-known for his research on GTP driven signal transduction pathways and the binding proteins, enzymes, and gene regulation of those pathways. Additionally, Kaziro assisted in proposing a mechanism for the carboxylation of CoA proteins resulting from a conformational change induced by ATP hydrolysis.

Kaziro’s research under Severo Ochoa in the Department of Biochemistry at New York University Medical Center began in 1960 with an examination of biotin and its role in the propionyl carboxylase reaction converting propionyl CoA to methylmalonyl CoA. By producing a crystallized pig heart propionyl carboxylase, Kaziro and his team were able to observe the effects of biotin and sulfhydryl binding reagents on the enzyme’s function. Kaziro and his team found that the mechanism for the carboxylation and decarboxylation of the propionyl carboxylase enzyme takes place over two reactions, and proposed that a side reaction is responsible for the CO_{2} dependent exchange of Pi and ADP with ATP. They also found that their highly purified pig heart propionyl carboxylase enzyme contained significant amounts of biotin. Because no biotin was released following their preparation of the sample with perchloric acid, they concluded that biotin is covalently bound to the enzyme.

After researching the propionyl carboxylase reaction for another year in Ochoa’s lab, Kaziro and his team released an article in 1961 refining their mechanism for the enzyme’s reaction. The research team proposed an overall mechanism involving the exchange of ATP for ADP and Pi resulting in the attachment of CO_{2} to the propionyl carboxylase enzyme. The attachment of CO_{2} to the enzyme catalyzed the reaction of converting propionyl CoA to methylmalonyl CoA. Kaziro and his colleagues found that the reaction converting propionyl CoA to methylmalonyl CoA catalyzed by propionyl carboxylase results from two separate, reversible reactions that work together for carboxylation or decarboxylation of the enzyme. In the presence of magnesium ions, the enzyme was carboxylated by CO_{2}¬ and ATP, while in the absence of magnesium ions, the enzyme was carboxylated by methylmalonyl CoA. For decarboxylation of the enzyme, those two reactions run in the reversed direction. In 1962, Kaziro and his research team at Ochoa’s lab continued research on the propionyl carboxylase mechanism, proposing more refined details of the mechanism. Kaziro and his team found that ATP undergoes arsenolysis, indicating that the formation of CO_{2} bound to the enzyme occurs as a single step reaction, and that HCO3 is a reactive species of CO_{2} in the propionyl carboxylase reaction.

During his years of research at IMSUT, Kaziro focused on GTP binding proteins, the role of GTPases in signal transduction, and the role of GTP in mRNA gene expression. In 1971, Kaziro led research on identifying the properties of the two H-GTP binding proteins in E. coli. Factor T is one of two complementary factors that are required for the elongation of peptide bonds on ribosomes within E. coli. Factor T divides into Tu and Ts components, where in the presence of GTP, a Tu-Ts complex will dissociated to Tu and Ts, and reassociate in the absence of guanine. The research team suggested that the Tu-Ts complex is dissociated only in the presence of GTP.

In 1974, Kaziro led a research team in examining the role of GTP in the translocation of proteins through a ribosome. In the presence of elongation factor G (EF-G) and GTP, N-acetyldiphenylalanyl-tRNA shifts from the A site (Complex 2) in the ribosome to the P site in the ribosome. The researchers found that 5’-guanylylmethylenediphosphonate (Gpp(CH2)p), a nonhydrolyzable form for GTP, could be used to study the reaction’s impact on Complex II of the ribosome. Kaziro and his team found that GTP helps facilitate the binding of EF-G to Complex II during the translocation reaction. Additionally, they proposed that GTP hydrolysis is involved with the removal of EF-G after the translocation reaction.

In 1978, Kaziro published an extensive article outlining the role of guanosine 5’-triphosphate in the elongation of polypeptide chains within a ribosome. Kaziro first explains the protein complexes involved with synthesizing new proteins and details the process of protein synthesis with a ribosome. Kaziro then overviews prominent complementary factors involved with protein elongation such as EF-Tu, EF-Ts, and many other prokaryotic elongation factors. Kaziro then explains how GTP interacts with these prokaryotic elongation factors and promotes conformational changes through hydrolysis.

Kaziro further broadened his research profile in 1986, when he began a genetic study on Granulocyte colony-stimulating factor (G-CSF). G-CSF is a hormone-like glycoprotein that assists in regulating the cell proliferation and differentiation of hematopoietic cells, or those blood stem cells that mature and differentiate into blood’s cellular components. By establishing a human squamous carcinoma cell line, Kaziro and his team were able to produce large quantities of purified G-CSF. The team was able to determine a partial amino acid sequence of the protein and produced several clones within cells. This allowed the researchers to determine the complete nucleotide sequences of the cDNA, expressing normal G-CSF activity. Additionally, Kaziro and his team concluded that the human genome contains only one gene for G-CSF.

In 1988, Kaziro began research on the human Gs alpha gene, involved with the formation of the alpha subunit of G proteins. G proteins are guanine nucleotide proteins that work in regulating adenylate cyclase, involved with transmembrane signaling. The alpha subunits of these G-protein complexes are responsible for binding to the guanine nucleotide and are unique to each type of G-protein. Kaziro and his research time isolated the gene for Gs alpha by using a probe of rat Gs alpha cDNA. Kaziro determined that human haploid genome likely contains a single Gs alpha gene. By examining the structure of the human Gs alpha gene, Kaziro and his team suggested that four types of Gs alpha mRNA strands may be produced from the single gene, resulting from various splicing patterns of the gene’s introns and exons. Kaziro also characterized the promoter region of the human Gs alpha gene as having an extremely high guanine nucleotide content.

In 1991, Kaziro compiled years of his research involving the structure and function of GTP binding proteins and described various signal transduction pathways. Kaziro and his team detailed the association of protein elongation factors with GTP hydrolysis. Additionally, Kaziro explained the GTPase functioning of Ras proteins that work as molecular switches for cell differentiation, cell growth, and apoptosis. Kaziro also explained the steps of the GTPase cycle.

Towards the end of his research with The University of Tokyo, Kaziro began a more detailed examination of Ras proteins, examining RNA aptamers that inhibit Ras-induced activation of Raf-1. Raf-1 cytoplasmic kinase enzyme that transmits proliferative and developmental signals from a cell’s plasma membrane to its cytosol and nucleus. Kaziro and his team developed RNA aptamers that inhibited Ras’s interaction with Raf-1’s binding domain due to the aptamer’s high affinity for the Ras-binding domain. Kaziro concluded that the RNA 9A aptamer was the most potent and could be used as a tool for researchers to regulate the Ras and Raf-1 cell signaling pathways in cells. Additionally, Kaziro studied a particular mutation of G-protein coupled inward rectifiers (GIRKs) that may play a role in the development of Andersen’s disease. Kaziro and his team identified a mutation of a glutamate residue located on the C-terminal of potassium inward rectifier channels. The research team concluded that the area of the mutation must be one of the determinants for controlling the ion gate opening for GIRKs and potassium inward rectifier channels. This mutation’s link to Andersen’s syndrome is its corresponding location to one of the prominent genetic causes for the syndrome.

== Awards and society memberships ==
- Awards
  - 1972 – 9th Matsunaga Prize
  - 1980 – Takeda Medical Prize
  - 1995 – Medal with Purple Ribbon
  - 1999 – Japan Gakushiin Prize
  - 2002 – Foreign Member of the National Academy of Sciences, USA
  - 2002 – Member of Microbiology Academy, USA
  - 2005 – Medal of Orders of the Sacred Treasure of Japan
  - 2006 – Honorary member of Japanese Biochemical Society
- Memberships and Society Positions
  - 1972 – 1976: Associate Editor for the Journal of Biochemistry
  - 1974 – 1999: Member of the Symposium Committee for the Japanese Delegation of the International Union of Biochemistry (IUB)
  - 1975 – 1983: Trustee of the Federation of Asian and Oceanian Biochemists (FAOB)
  - 1976 – 1999: Member of the Biochemical Research Committee of the Academic Council of Japan
  - 1979 – 1983 and 1987-1992: Council Member of the Molecular Biology Society of Japan
  - 1979 – 2011: Trustee of Sanyo Gakuen University
  - 1983 – 1984: Vice President of the Japanese Biochemical Society
  - 1984 – 1985: President of the Japanese Biochemical Society
  - 1987 – 1995: Member of the Editorial Board for Biochimica et Biophysica Acta
  - 1987 – 1993: Member of the Editorial Board for Biochemistry (USA)
  - 1987 – 2002: Member of the Editorial Board for Biochimie (France)
  - 1989 – 2002: Member of the Editorial Board for J. Biology Chemistry (USA)
  - 1992 – 2011: President of Sanyo Gakuen University
  - 2000 – 2011: Council member of the Takeda Science Foundation
  - 2004 – 2011: Council member of the Tokyo Medical Research Foundation
  - 2008 – 2011: Advisor of the Editorial Board with the Asia-Pacific International Molecular Biology Network
