= Protein-synthesizing GTPase =

Class of enzymes

Identifiers
- EC no.: 3.6.5.3

Databases
- IntEnz: IntEnz view
- BRENDA: BRENDA entry
- ExPASy: NiceZyme view
- KEGG: KEGG entry
- MetaCyc: metabolic pathway
- PRIAM: profile
- PDB structures: RCSB PDB PDBe PDBsum
Search
- PMC: articles
- PubMed: articles
- NCBI: proteins

Protein-synthesizing GTPases (EC 3.6.5.3, elongation factor (EF), initiation factor (IF), peptide-release or termination factor) are enzymes involved in mRNA translation into protein by the ribosome, with systematic name GTP phosphohydrolase (mRNA-translation-assisting). They usually include translation initiation factors such as IF-2 and translation elongation factors such as EF-Tu.
