= MSTO1 =

Protein-coding gene in humans

Identifiers
- Aliases: MSTO1, MST, LST005, misato 1, mitochondrial distribution and morphology regulator, MMYAT, misato mitochondrial distribution and morphology regulator 1
- External IDs: OMIM: 617619; MGI: 2385175; GeneCards: MSTO1

Gene location (Human)
Chr.	Chromosome 1 (human)
Band	1q22	Start	155,610,205 bp
Band	1q22	End	155,614,951 bp

Gene location (Mouse)
Chr.	Chromosome 3 (mouse)
Band	3|3 F1	Start	88,812,414 bp
Band	3|3 F1	End	88,821,306 bp
RNA expression pattern
Bgee	Human / Mouse (ortholog); Top expressed in: left testis; right testis; pituitary gland; right ovary; anterior pituitary; left ovary; tibial nerve; right uterine tube; body of uterus; right lobe of thyroid gland / Top expressed in: spermatid; yolk sac; spermatocyte; seminiferous tubule; epiblast; internal carotid artery; embryo; external carotid artery; embryo; primitive streak; More reference expression data
BioGPS	n/a
Gene ontology
Molecular function	molecular function
Cellular component	mitochondrial outer membrane; mitochondrion; membrane; cytoplasm
Biological process	mitochondrion organization; mitochondrion distribution; mitochondrial genome maintenance; mitotic sister chromatid segregation; mitotic spindle assembly
Sources:Amigo / QuickGO
Orthologs
Databases	NCBI: entry; OMA: entry
Species	Human	Mouse
Entrez	55154	229524
Ensembl	ENSG00000125459	ENSMUSG00000068922
UniProt	Q9BUK6	Q2YDW2
RefSeq (mRNA)	NM_001256532; NM_001256533; NM_018116; NM_001350772; NM_001350773 NM_001350774; NM_001350775; NM_001350776; NM_001350777; NM_001350778; NM_001350779; NM_001350780; NM_001350781; NM_001350782; NM_001350783; NM_001350784; NM_001350785; NM_001350786; NM_001350787; NM_001350788; NM_001350789	NM_144898
RefSeq (protein)	NP_001243461; NP_001243462; NP_060586; NP_001337701; NP_001337702 NP_001337703; NP_001337704; NP_001337705; NP_001337706; NP_001337707; NP_001337708; NP_001337709; NP_001337710; NP_001337711; NP_001337712; NP_001337713; NP_001337714; NP_001337715; NP_001337716; NP_001337717; NP_001337718	NP_659147
Location (UCSC)	Chr 1: 155.61 – 155.61 Mb	Chr 3: 88.81 – 88.82 Mb
PubMed search
- Wikidata
View/Edit Human	View/Edit Mouse

Protein misato homolog 1 is a protein that in humans is encoded by the MSTO1 gene.

The MSTO1 gene is 5134 base pairs (located in chromosome 1) and the MSTO1 protein is 570 amino acids in length. It is located in the outer membrane of the mitochondrion, and is involved in the regulation of mitochondrial distribution and morphology.

== Structure ==
The misato protein contains an N-terminal misato segment II myosin-like domain and a central tubulin domain.
