= Elongation factor P =

Elongation factor P (EF-P) KOW-like domain
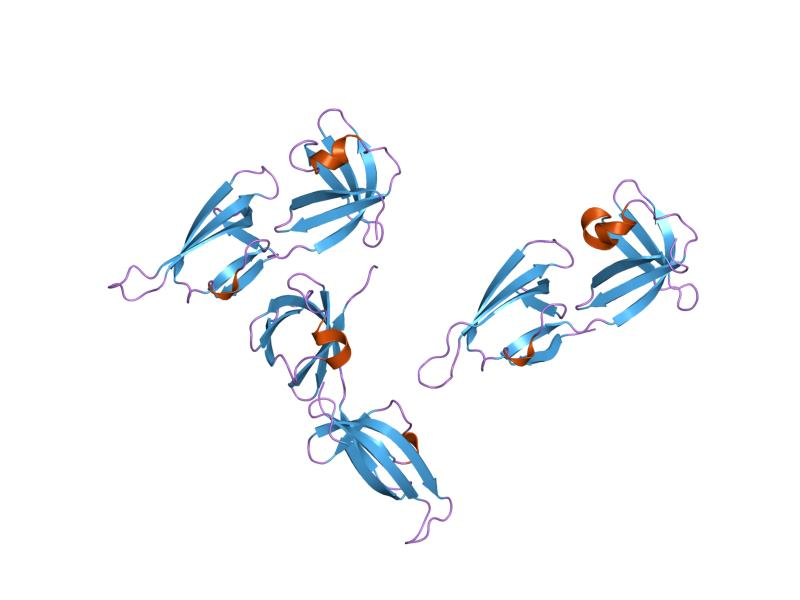
- crystal structure of translation initiation factor 5a from pyrococcus horikoshii

Identifiers
- Symbol: EFP_N
- Pfam: PF08207
- Pfam clan: CL0107
- InterPro: IPR013185
- PROSITE: PDOC00981
Available protein structures:
- PDB: IPR013185 PF08207 (ECOD; PDBsum)
- AlphaFold: IPR013185; PF08207

Elongation factor P (EF-P) OB domain
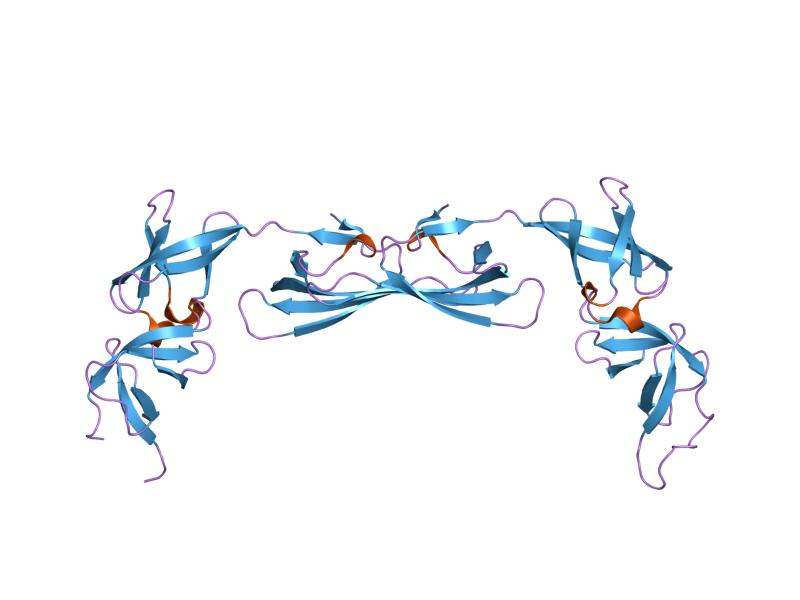
- crystal structure of translation elongation factor p from thermus thermophilus hb8

Identifiers
- Symbol: EFP
- Pfam: PF01132
- Pfam clan: CL0021
- InterPro: IPR001059
- PROSITE: PDOC00981
- CDD: cd04470
Available protein structures:
- PDB: IPR001059 PF01132 (ECOD; PDBsum)
- AlphaFold: IPR001059; PF01132

Elongation factor P, C-terminal
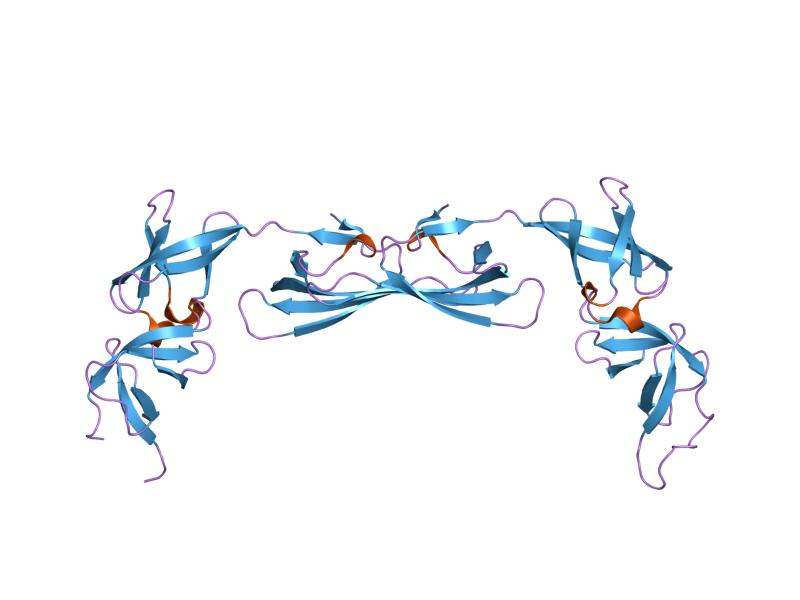
- crystal structure of translation elongation factor p from thermus thermophilus hb8

Identifiers
- Symbol: Elong-fact-P_C
- Pfam: PF09285
- InterPro: IPR015365
- SCOP2: 1ueb / SCOPe / SUPFAM
- CDD: cd05794
Available protein structures:
- PDB: IPR015365 PF09285 (ECOD; PDBsum)
- AlphaFold: IPR015365; PF09285

EF-P (elongation factor P) is an essential protein that in bacteria stimulates the formation of the first peptide bonds in protein synthesis. Studies show that EF-P prevents ribosomes from stalling during the synthesis of proteins containing consecutive prolines. EF-P binds to a site located between the binding site for the peptidyl tRNA (P site) and the exiting tRNA (E site). It spans both ribosomal subunits with its amino-terminal domain positioned adjacent to the aminoacyl acceptor stem and its carboxyl-terminal domain positioned next to the anticodon stem-loop of the P site-bound initiator tRNA. The EF-P protein shape and size is very similar to a tRNA and interacts with the ribosome via the exit "E" site on the 30S subunit and the peptidyl-transferase center (PTC) of the 50S subunit. EF-P is a translation aspect of an unknown function, therefore It probably functions indirectly by altering the affinity of the ribosome for aminoacyl-tRNA, thus increasing their reactivity as acceptors for peptidyl transferase.

EF-P consists of three domains:

- An N-terminal KOW-like domain
- A central OB domain, which forms an oligonucleotide-binding (OB)-fold. It is not clear if this region is involved in binding nucleic acids
- A C-terminal domain which adopts an OB-fold, with five beta-strands forming a beta-barrel in a Greek-key topology

Eukaryotes and archaea lack EF-P. In these domains, a similar function is performed by the archaeo-eukaryotic initiation factor, a/eIF-5A, which exhibits some modest sequence and structural similarity with EF-P. There are, however, important differences between EF-p and eIF-5A. (a) EF-P has a structure similar to that of L-shaped tRNA and it contains three (I, II and III) β-barrel domains. In contrast, eIF-5A contains only two domains (C and N) with a corresponding size difference. (b) Moreover, as opposed to eIF-5A, which contains the non-proteinogenic amino acid hypusine that is essential for its activity, EF-P displays a diversity of post-transcriptional modifications at the analogous position (β-lysylation of lysine residue, rhamnosylation of arginine residue, or none at all).

== Function ==
In eubacteria, there are three groups of factors that promote protein synthesis: initiation factors, elongation factors and termination factors. The elongation phase of translation is promoted by three universal elongation factors, EF-Tu, EF-Ts, and EF-G. EF-P was discovered in 1975 by Glick and Ganoza, as a factor that increased the yield of peptide bond formation between initiator fMet-tRNA(fMet) and a mimic of aa-tRNA, puromycin (Pmn). The low yield of product formation in absence of EF-P can be described by the loss of peptidyl-tRNA from the stalled ribosome. Thus, EF-P is not a necessary component of minimal in vitro translation system, however, the absence of EF-P can limit translation rate, increase antibiotic sensitivity, and slow growth.

To complete its function, EF-P enters paused ribosomes through the E-site and facilitates peptide bond formation through interactions with the P-site tRNA. EF-P and eIF-5A both are essential for the synthesis of a subset of proteins containing proline stretches in all cells.

It has been suggested that after binding of the initiator tRNA to the P/I site, it is correctly positioned to the P site by binding of EF-P to the E site. Additionally, EF-P has been shown to assist in efficient translation of three or more consecutive proline residues.

== Structure ==
EF-P is a 21 kDa protein encoded by the efp gene. EF-P consists of three β-barrel domains (I, II and III) and has a L shape tRNA structure. Domain II and III of EF-P are similar to each other. Despite the structural similarity of EF-P with tRNA, studies showed that EF-P does not bind to the ribosome at the classical tRNA binding site, but at the distinct position that is located between the P and E sites.

== See also ==
- Prokaryotic elongation factors
- EF-Ts (elongation factor thermo stable)
- EF-Tu (elongation factor thermo unstable)
- EF-G (elongation factor G)
- EIF5A
- Protein translation
- GTPase
