= GUF1 =

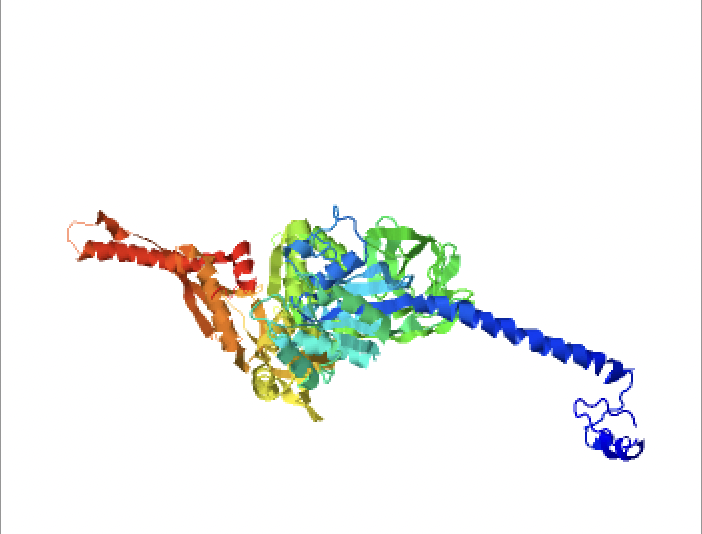

Identifiers
- Aliases: GUF1, EF-4, GUF1 homolog, GTPase, EIEE40, EF4, GTP binding elongation factor DEE40
- External IDs: OMIM: 617064; MGI: 2140726; GeneCards: GUF1

Gene location (Human)
Chr.	Chromosome 4 (human)
Band	4p12	Start	44,678,420 bp
Band	4p12	End	44,700,928 bp

Gene location (Mouse)
Chr.	Chromosome 5 (mouse)
Band	5|5 C3.1	Start	69,714,266 bp
Band	5|5 C3.1	End	69,733,316 bp
RNA expression pattern
Bgee	Human / Mouse (ortholog); Top expressed in: ventricular zone; gastrocnemius muscle; biceps brachii; muscle of thigh; ganglionic eminence; Skeletal muscle tissue of rectus abdominis; Achilles tendon; anterior cingulate cortex; rectum; Skeletal muscle tissue of biceps brachii / Top expressed in: tail of embryo; ventricular zone; hand; neural layer of retina; otolith organ; right kidney; muscle of thigh; utricle; lens; superior frontal gyrus; More reference expression data
BioGPS	n/a
Gene ontology
Molecular function	nucleotide binding; GTP binding; hydrolase activity; GTPase activity; ribosome binding
Cellular component	mitochondrial inner membrane; membrane; mitochondrion; mitochondrial matrix
Biological process	protein biosynthesis; positive regulation of translation
Sources:Amigo / QuickGO
Orthologs
Databases	NCBI: entry; OMA: entry
Species	Human	Mouse
Entrez	60558	231279
Ensembl	ENSG00000151806	ENSMUSG00000029208
UniProt	Q8N442	Q8C3X4
RefSeq (mRNA)	NM_021927; NM_001345867; NM_001345868; NM_001345869	NM_172711; NM_182768; NM_001310631
RefSeq (protein)	NP_001332796; NP_001332797; NP_001332798; NP_068746	NP_001297560; NP_766299
Location (UCSC)	Chr 4: 44.68 – 44.7 Mb	Chr 5: 69.71 – 69.73 Mb
PubMed search
- Wikidata
View/Edit Human	View/Edit Mouse

Mitochondrial GTP binding elongation factor (Homo Sapiens, GUF1), is a protein which in humans is encoded by the GUF1 gene. The GUF1 protein plays an important role in maintaining proper mitochondrial function, ensuring accuracy when mitochondrial genes are being translated. The gene shows the most expression in the brain, while the least expression is found in the pancreas.

== Function and biochemistry ==
GUF1 is a GTPase that hydrolyzes GTP to GDP and plays an important role in maintaining mitochondrial function by ensuring accurate translation of mitochondrial genes. It helps prevent amino acid mis-incorporation under stress by facilitating ribosomal back-translocation during protein synthesis. Additionally, its C-terminal region aids in tRNA interaction, distinguishing it from other GTPases.

The highly conserved C-terminal of GUF1 facilitates tRNA binding, while the N-terminal handles GTP binding and hydrolysis. The G domain supports core GTPase activity.

== Gene ==
=== Locus ===
GUF1 is located at 4p12 on the positive strand of the chromosome and consists of 17 exons.

GUF1 protein found in the mitochondrial matrix and highly associated with the inner membrane. This protein goes by many names including; EF-4, GUF1 homolog, GTPase, and DEE40. The gene spans 22,000 nucleotides, and the protein it encodes is 669 amino acids long.

Location of GUF1 on human chromosome 4.

=== Gene expression ===
RNA-seq data for GUF1 gene expression across tissue types showed high expression in the brain and cerebellum, with the lowest expression in the pancreas. Other tissues exhibited moderate expression levels. Microarray data from various human tissues supported the RNA-seq findings, confirming the reliability of the results.

== Protein ==
GUF1 encodes three isoforms, with this article focusing on isoform one. The GUF1 protein has a theoretical pI of 8.75 and a molecular weight of 74.3 kD, and it is widely expressed across all amino acids.

The human GUF1 protein contains 17 motif sites, including 13 phosphorylation sites (e.g., CK2 and PKC-specific), which may regulate its function and signaling pathways. Additionally, there are 3 myristylation and 3 glycosylation sites.

=== Protein level regulation ===
GUF1 is primarily localized to the mitochondria, with 93% of the protein found in this organelle. Deeplocs analysis also shows 22.7% localization to the nucleus and 29.5% to the cytoplasm. This strong mitochondrial localization suggests that GUF1 plays a crucial role in mitochondrial functions. This important role can include things such as protein synthesis and energy production. GUF1 presence in the nucleus and cytoplasm can also indicate involvement in gene regulation.

An analysis via PSORT II illustrates that GUF1 lacks a strong N-terminal signal peptide. This could indicate that this protein is likely not secreted or directed to the secretory pathway. The predicted cleavage site for GUF1 is between positions 44 and 45; this could suggest that the protein might have a segment that is cut off to guide it to the right place in the cell.

== Transcript ==
GUF1 undergoes alternative splicing and this leads to several transcript variants.

Isoforms	Session Number	Length	Additional Details
Isoform 1	NP_068746.2	22,000	fully coding for a functional GUF1 protein
Isoform 2	NP_001332796.1	22,000	exons skipped, results in truncated protein
Isoform 3	NP_001332797.1	22,000	N/A

== Homology ==
=== Orthologs ===
GUF1 has orthologs in many organisms, including vertebrates, and some invertebrates. 20 GUF1 orthologs sorted by taxonomy, sequence data, and classification. The high similarity highlights GUF1's evolutionary importance as it remains conserved in species over time.

Table of Orthologs for Human GUF1
TMEM12	Genes & Species	Common name	taxonomic group	date of divergence (MYA)	accession number	sequence length	sequence identity to human protein	sequence similarity %
Mammal	Homo sapiens	Human	Primates	0	NP_068746.2	669	100.0%	100.0%
	Macaca mullata	Rhesus monkey	Primates	28.8	XP_014993782.1	663	96.9%	97.9%
	Rattus norvegicus	Norway rat	Rodentia	87	NP_001100685.1	659	86.7%	93.9%
	Canis lupus familiaris	Dog	Carnivora	94	XP_038411911.1	610	94.9%	89.4%
	Bos taurus	Domestic cattle	Artiodactyla	94	XP_010804407.1	669	90.9%	71.3%
	Vombatus ursinus	Common wombat	Diprotodontia	160	XP_027691870.1	675	85.9%	90.9%
Reptillia/Aves	Elgaria multicarinata webbii	Southern alligator lizard	Squamata	319	XP_062991422.1	663	84.6%	86.9%
	Pterocles gutturalis	Yellow-throated sandgrouse	Galliformes	319	XP_010085396.1	610	83.1%	84.3%
	Mesitornis unicolor	Brown Roatelo	Galliformes	319	XP_010191475.1	610	81.6%	84.0%
	Chelonia mydas	Green sea turtle	Testudines	319	XP_037753775.1	664	81.5%	88.5%
	Hirundo rustica	Barn swallow	Passeriformes	319	XP_039921140.1	658	80.4%	88.5%
	Gallus gallus	Chicken	Galliformes	319	XP_001232470.2	660	80.2%	87.0%
	Alligator mississippiensis	American alligator	Crocodilia	319	XP_019336662.1	738	79.0%	80.8%
Amphibian	Xenopus Tropicalis	Tropical clawed frog	Anura	352	XP_002933495.1	676	80.5%	83.7%
	Spea bombifrons	Plains spadefoot toad	Anura	352	XP_053314393.1	673	79.9%	83.0%
	Nanorana parkeri	High himalaya frog	Anura	352	XP_018420074.1	676	79.0%	84.4%
	Lates calcarifer	Barramundi perch	Perciformes	429	XP_018525292.1	671	79.6%	82.5%
Fish	Danio rerio	Zebrafish	Cypriniformes	429	XP_068069393.1	680	78.1%	81.7%

=== Paralogs ===
There are four paralogs of GUF1 in humans.

Table of Paralogs for Human GUF1
TMEM12	Species	Common name	Accession number	Sequence length	Sequence Identity
EEF2	Homo sapiens	Human	AAH06547.1	583	40.28%
MTIF2	Homo sapiens	Human	AAH64977.1	465	28.19%
EEF1A1	Homo sapiens	Human	AAH71619.1	441	26.86%
HBS1L	Homo sapiens	Human	5LZW_jj	710	25.00%

== Evolutionary history ==
GUF1 is a highly conserved protein that first appeared in fish approximately 429 million years ago and remains significant across species due to its conservation among orthologs.

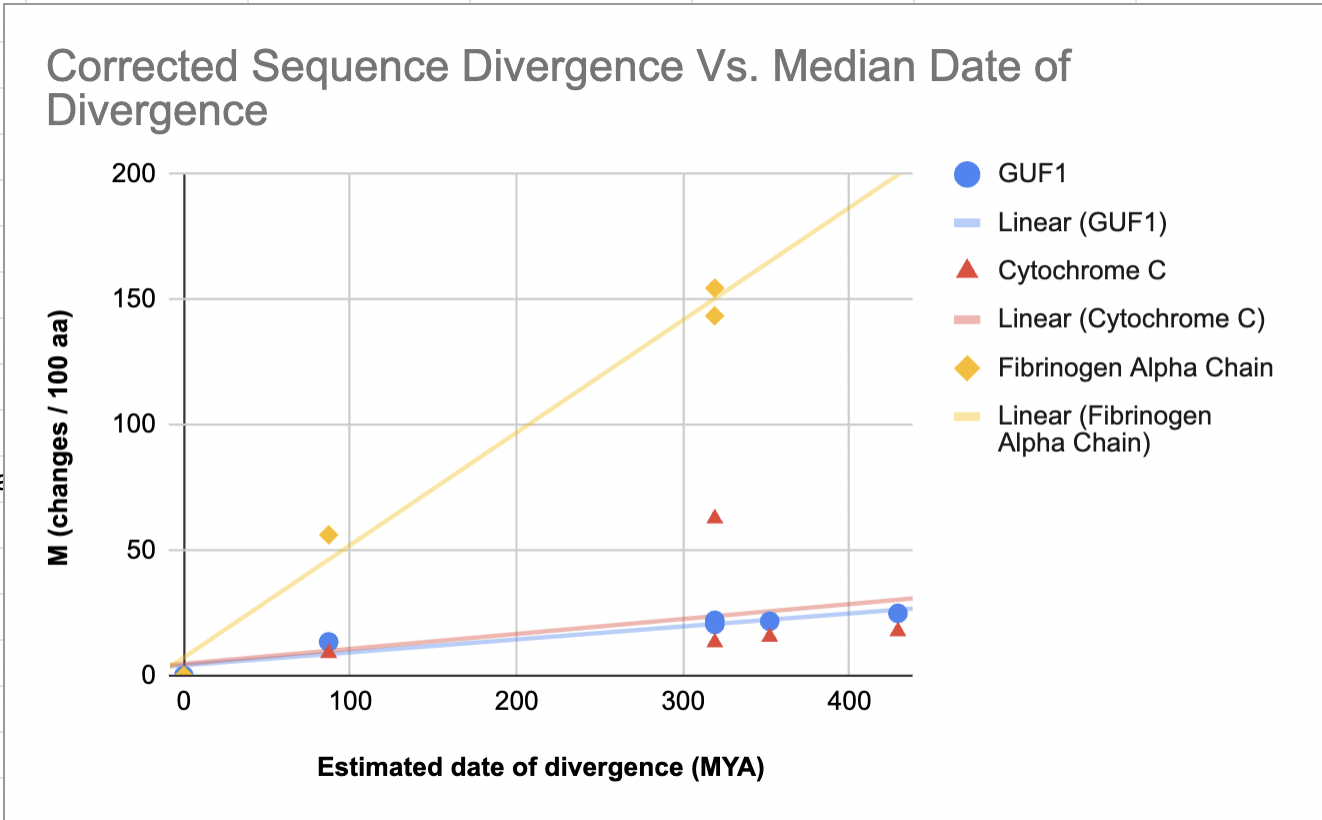
The graph above displays the mutation rates of GUF1, Cytochrome C, and the Fibrinogen alpha chain, revealing a positive correlation between divergence time and mutation rates. Notably, GUF1 evolves significantly faster than Cytochrome C and the Fibrinogen alpha chain.

== Interacting proteins ==
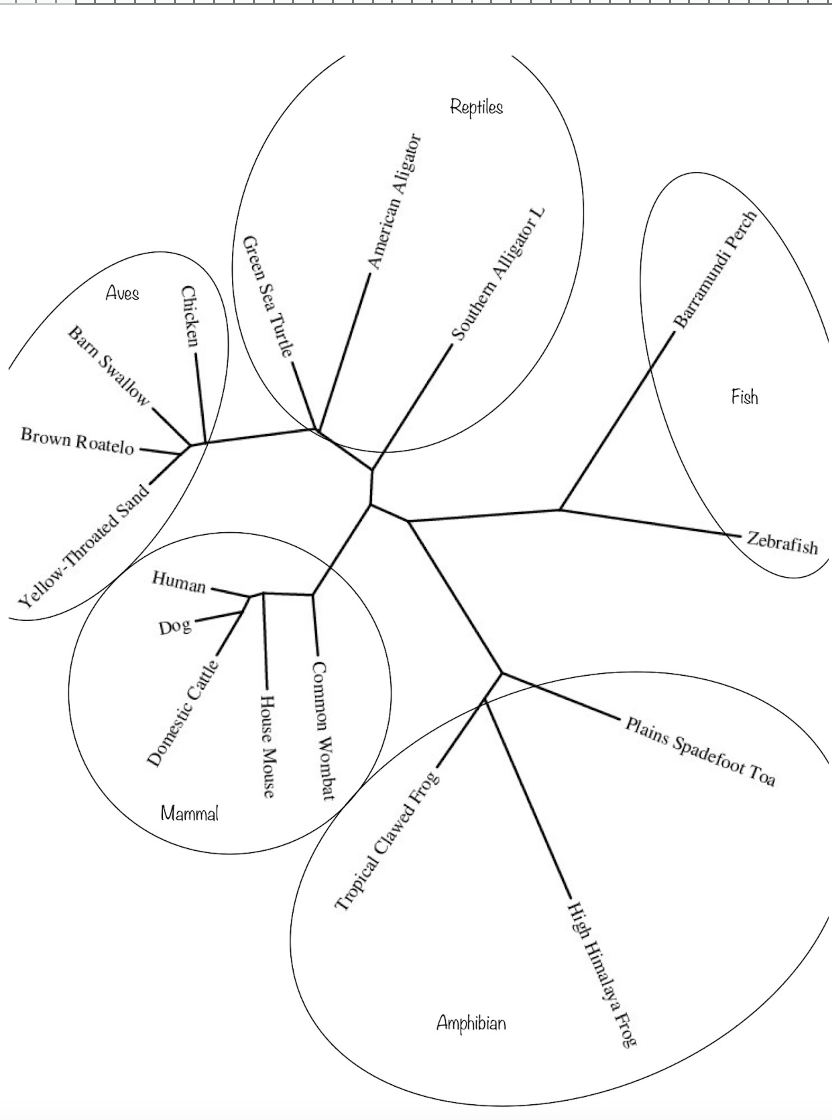
The unrooted phylogenetic tree illustrates the evolutionary history of GUF1 orthologs, with circles indicating species group classifications

GUF1 interacts with several proteins involved in mitochondrial translation and ribosomal function. POLR3A is a notable protein, that is involved in RNA transcription. MRPL32, MRPL20, MRPS6, and MRPS9 are the other mitochondrial ribosomal proteins. These proteins are essential for mitochondrial protein synthesis, highlighting GUF1's role in maintaining mitochondrial function. GUF1 also interacts with ribosomal proteins like RPL5, RPL11, RPL23, and RPS11. These interactions further links GUF1 to protein synthesis regulation.

== Clinical significance ==
A study titled GUF1 Overexpression Improves Pancreatic β Cell Functions in Type 2 Diabetes Mellitus Rats with Roux-en-Y Gastric Bypass Surgery found that GUF1 is upregulated post-surgery, enhancing mitochondrial function, promoting β cell proliferation, and reducing apoptosis, ultimately improving β cell function. Learn more in the suggested reading.
