= OLA1 =

Protein-coding gene in the species Homo sapiens

Identifiers
- Aliases: OLA1, DOC45, GBP45, GTBP9, GTPBP9, PTD004, Obg-like ATPase 1, Obg like ATPase 1
- External IDs: OMIM: 611175; MGI: 1914309; GeneCards: OLA1
Available structures
PDB	Ortholog search: PDBe RCSB
PDB	List of PDB id codes 2OHF

Gene location (Human)
Chr.	Chromosome 2 (human)
Band	2q31.1	Start	174,072,447 bp
Band	2q31.1	End	174,248,599 bp

Gene location (Mouse)
Chr.	Chromosome 2 (mouse)
Band	2|2 C3	Start	72,923,145 bp
Band	2|2 C3	End	73,049,268 bp
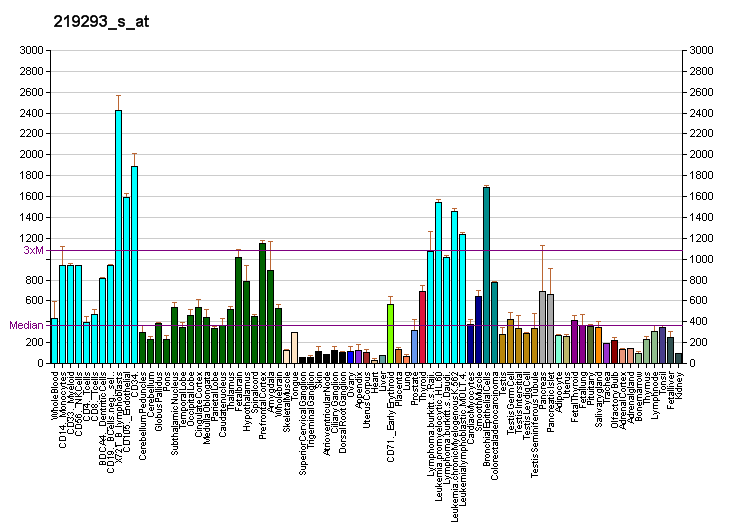
RNA expression pattern
Bgee	Human / Mouse (ortholog); Top expressed in: endothelial cell; ganglionic eminence; lateral nuclear group of thalamus; pons; Brodmann area 23; gingival epithelium; lactiferous duct; parotid gland; entorhinal cortex; ventricular zone / Top expressed in: Paneth cell; tail of embryo; cumulus cell; condyle; ureter; medial ganglionic eminence; primitive streak; epiblast; barrel cortex; hair follicle; More reference expression data
BioGPS	More reference expression data
Gene ontology
Molecular function	nucleotide binding; GTP binding; protein binding; hydrolase activity; metal ion binding; ATP binding; ATPase activity; cadherin binding; ribosome binding; ribosomal large subunit binding
Cellular component	centrosome; nucleolus; extracellular exosome; membrane; nucleus; extracellular region; cytoplasm; cytosol; platelet alpha granule lumen
Biological process	ATP metabolic process; platelet degranulation
Sources:Amigo / QuickGO
Orthologs
Databases	NCBI: entry; OMA: entry
Species	Human	Mouse
Entrez	29789	67059
Ensembl	ENSG00000138430	ENSMUSG00000027108
UniProt	Q9NTK5	Q9CZ30
RefSeq (mRNA)	NM_013341; NM_001011708; NM_001328688	NM_025942; NM_030091
RefSeq (protein)	NP_001011708; NP_001315617; NP_037473	NP_080218; NP_084367
Location (UCSC)	Chr 2: 174.07 – 174.25 Mb	Chr 2: 72.92 – 73.05 Mb
PubMed search
- Wikidata
View/Edit Human	View/Edit Mouse

Obg-like ATPase 1 is an enzyme that in humans is encoded by the OLA1 gene. Ola1 belongs to the protein family of Obg-like GTPases but defines an exceptional example of a protein that has evolved altered nucleotide specificity and binds adenosine triphosphate (ATP) with higher affinity than guanosine triphosphate (GTP).
