= EF-4 =

Elongation factor

Elongation factor 4

Identifiers
- Symbol: EF-4
- InterPro: IPR006297
- For well-annotaterd examples, see P60785 (E. coli LepA) and Q8N442 (human GUF1).

Elongation factor 4 (EF-4) is an elongation factor that is thought to back-translocate on the ribosome during the translation of RNA to proteins. It is found near-universally in bacteria and in eukaryotic endosymbiotic organelles including the mitochondria and the plastid. Responsible for proofreading during protein synthesis, EF-4 is a recent addition to the nomenclature of bacterial elongation factors.

Prior to its recognition as an elongation factor, EF-4 was known as leader peptidase A (LepA), as it is the first cistron on the operon carrying the bacterial leader peptidase. In eukaryotes it is traditionally called GUF1 (GTPase of Unknown Function 1). It has the preliminary EC number 3.6.5.n1.

== Evolutionary background ==
LepA has a highly conserved sequence. LepA orthologs have been found in bacteria and almost all eukaryotes. The conservation in LepA has been shown to cover the entire protein. More specifically, the amino acid identity of LepA among bacterial orthologs ranges from 55%-68%.

Two forms of LepA have been observed; one form of LepA branches with mitochondrial LepA sequences, while the second form branches with cyanobacterial orthologs. These findings demonstrate that LepA is significant for bacteria, mitochondria, and plastids. LepA is absent from archaea.

== Structure ==
The gene encoding LepA is known to be the first cistron as part of a bicistron operon. LepA is a polypeptide of 599 amino acids with a molecular weight of 67 kDa. The amino acid sequence of LepA indicates that it is a G protein, which consists of five known domains. The first four domains are strongly related to domains I, II, III, and V of primary elongation factor EF-G. However, the last domain of LepA is unique. This specific domain resides on the C-terminal end of the protein structure. This arrangement of LepA has been observed in the mitochondria of yeast cells to human cells.

== Function ==
LepA is suspected to improve the fidelity of translation by recognizing a ribosome with mistranslocated tRNA and consequently inducing a back-translocation. By back-translocating the already post-transcriptionally modified ribosome, the EF-G factor capable of secondary translocation. Back-translocation by LepA occurs at a similar rate as an EF-G-dependent translocation. As mentioned above, EF-G's structure is highly analogous to LepA's structure; LepA's function is thus similarly analogous to EF-G's function. However, Domain IV of EF-G has been shown through several studies to occupy the decoding sequence of the A site after the tRNAs have been translocated from A and P sites to the P and E sites. Thus, domain IV of EF-G prevents back-movement of the tRNA. Despite the structural similarities between LepA and EF-G, LepA lacks this Domain IV. Thus LepA reduces the activation barrier between Pre and POST states in a similar way to EF-G but is, at the same time, able to catalyze a back-translocation rather that a canonical translocation.

== Activity ==
LepA exhibits uncoupled GTPase activity. This activity is stimulated by the ribosome to the same extent as the activity of EF-G, which is known to have the strongest ribosome-dependent GTPase activity among all characterized G proteins involved in translation. Conversely, uncoupled GTPase activity occurs when the ribosome stimulation of GTP cleavage is not directly dependent on protein synthesis. In the presence of GTP, LepA works catalytically. On the other hand, in the presence of the nonhydrolysable GTP – GDPNP – the LepA action becomes stoichiometric, saturating at about one molecule per 70S ribosomes. This data demonstrates that GTP cleavage is required for dissociation of LepA from the ribosome, which is demonstrative of a typical G protein. At low concentrations of LepA (less than or equal to 3 molecules per 70S ribosome), LepA specifically recognizes incorrectly translocated ribosomes, back-translocates them, and thus allows EF-G to have a second chance to catalyze the correct translocation reaction. At high concentrations (about 1 molecule per 70S ribosome), LepA loses its specificity and back-translocates every POST ribosome. This places the translational machinery in a nonreproductive mode. This explains the toxicity of LepA when it is found in a cell in high concentrations. Hence, at low concentrations LepA significantly improves the yield and activity of synthesized proteins; however, at high concentrations LepA is toxic to cells.

Additionally, LepA has an effect on peptide bond formation. Through various studies in which functional derivatives of ribosomes were mixed with puromycin (an analog of the 3' end of an aa-tRNA) it was determined that adding LepA to a post transcriptionally modified ribosome prevents dipeptide formation as it inhibits the binding of aa-tRNA to the A site.

== Experimental data ==
There have been various experiments elucidating the structure and function of LepA. One notable study is termed the "toeprinting experiment": this experiment helped to determine LepA's ability to back-translocate. In this case, a primer was extended via reverse transcription along mRNA which was ribosome-bound. The primers from modified mRNA strands from various ribosomes were extended with and without LepA. An assay was then conducted with both PRE and POST states, and cleavage studies revealed enhanced positional cleavage in the POST state as opposed to the PRE state. Since the POST state had been in the presence of LepA (plus GTP), it was determined that the strong signal characteristic of the POST state was the result of LepA which then brought the signal down to the level of the PRE state. Such a study demonstrated that that ribosome, upon binding to the LepA-GTP complex assumes the PRE state configuration.

== See also ==
- Prokaryotic elongation factors
- Eukaryotic elongation factors
