= GFM2 =

Protein-coding gene in the species Homo sapiens

Identifiers
- Aliases: GFM2, EF-G2mt, EFG2, MRRF2, MST027, RRF2, RRF2mt, hEFG2, mEF-G 2, MSTP027, G elongation factor, mitochondrial 2, G elongation factor mitochondrial 2, RRF, GTP dependent ribosome recycling factor mitochondrial 2
- External IDs: OMIM: 606544; MGI: 2444783; GeneCards: GFM2

Gene location (Human)
Chr.	Chromosome 5 (human)
Band	5q13.3	Start	74,721,206 bp
Band	5q13.3	End	74,767,147 bp

Gene location (Mouse)
Chr.	Chromosome 13 (mouse)
Band	13|13 D1	Start	97,274,445 bp
Band	13|13 D1	End	97,317,703 bp
RNA expression pattern
Bgee	Human / Mouse (ortholog); Top expressed in: myocardium of left ventricle; tibialis anterior muscle; bronchial epithelial cell; deltoid muscle; epithelium of nasopharynx; secondary oocyte; mucosa of ileum; cardiac muscle tissue of right atrium; right uterine tube; nasal epithelium / Top expressed in: muscle of thigh; otic vesicle; sternocleidomastoid muscle; otic placode; temporal muscle; right kidney; saccule; triceps brachii muscle; digastric muscle; skeletal muscle tissue; More reference expression data
BioGPS	n/a
Gene ontology
Molecular function	translation elongation factor activity; nucleotide binding; GTP binding; protein binding; GTPase activity
Cellular component	mitochondrial matrix; mitochondrion
Biological process	mitochondrial translational termination; mitochondrial translational elongation; ribosome disassembly; protein biosynthesis; mitochondrial translation; translational elongation
Sources:Amigo / QuickGO
Orthologs
Databases	NCBI: entry; OMA: entry
Species	Human	Mouse
Entrez	84340	320806
Ensembl	ENSG00000164347	ENSMUSG00000021666
UniProt	Q969S9	Q8R2Q4
RefSeq (mRNA)	NM_001281302; NM_032380; NM_170681; NM_170691	NM_001146043; NM_001271463; NM_001271464; NM_001271465; NM_177266
RefSeq (protein)	NP_001268231; NP_115756; NP_733781; NP_733792; NP_733792.1	NP_001139515; NP_001258392; NP_001258393; NP_001258394; NP_796240
Location (UCSC)	Chr 5: 74.72 – 74.77 Mb	Chr 13: 97.27 – 97.32 Mb
PubMed search
- Wikidata
View/Edit Human	View/Edit Mouse

Ribosome-releasing factor 2, mitochondrial is a protein that in humans is encoded by the GFM2 gene. Unlike the other EF-G homolog GFM1, GFM2 functions as a Ribosome Recycling Factor in termination.
