= Release factor =

Peptide chain release factor, bacterial Class 1

Identifiers
- Symbol: PCRF
- Pfam: PF03462
- InterPro: IPR005139
Available protein structures:
- PDB: IPR005139 PF03462 (ECOD; PDBsum)
- AlphaFold: IPR005139; PF03462

Peptide chain release factor, bacterial Class 1, PTH domain, GGQ

Identifiers
- Symbol: RF-1
- Pfam: PF00472
- Pfam clan: CL0337
- InterPro: IPR000352
- PROSITE: PS00745
Available protein structures:
- PDB: IPR000352 PF00472 (ECOD; PDBsum)
- AlphaFold: IPR000352; PF00472

Peptide chain release factor eRF1/aRF1

Identifiers
- Symbol: ?
- InterPro: IPR004403
Available protein structures:
- PDB: IPR004403
- AlphaFold: IPR004403

A release factor is a protein that allows for the termination of translation by recognizing the termination codon or stop codon in an mRNA sequence. They are named so because they release new peptides from the ribosome.

== Background ==
During translation of mRNA, most codons are recognized by "charged" tRNA molecules, called aminoacyl-tRNAs because they are adhered to specific amino acids corresponding to each tRNA's anticodon. In the standard genetic code, there are three mRNA stop codons: UAG ("amber"), UAA ("ochre"), and UGA ("opal" or "umber"). Although these stop codons are triplets just like ordinary codons, they are not decoded by tRNAs. It was discovered by Mario Capecchi in 1967 that, instead, tRNAs do not ordinarily recognize stop codons at all, and that what he named "release factor" was not a tRNA molecule but a protein. Later, it was demonstrated that different release factors recognize different stop codons.

== Classification ==
There are two classes of release factors. Class 1 release factors recognize stop codons; they bind to the A site of the ribosome in a way mimicking that of tRNA, releasing the new polypeptide as it disassembles the ribosome. Class 2 release factors are GTPases that enhance the activity of class 1 release factors. It helps the class 1 RF dissociate from the ribosome.

Bacterial release factors include RF1, RF2, and RF3 (or PrfA, PrfB, PrfC in the "peptide release factor" gene nomenclature). RF1 and RF2 are homologous class 1 RFs: RF1 recognizes UAA and UAG while RF2 recognizes UAA and UGA. RF3 is a class 2 release factor. Eukaryotic and archaeal release factors are named analogously, with the naming changed to "eRF" for "eukaryotic release factor" and vice versa. a/eRF1 can recognize all three stop codons, while eRF3 works just like RF3. Archaea do not have eRF3 and may instead use aEF-1a.

The bacterial and archaeo-eukaryotic release factors are believed to have evolved convergently because bacterial and archaeo-eukaryotic class 1 release factors do not share sequence or structural homology. The homology in class 2 is restricted to the fact that both are GTPases. It is believed that bacterial RF3 evolved from EF-G while eRF3 evolved from eEF-1α.

In line with their symbiotic origin, eukaryotic mitochondria and plastids use bacterial-type class I release factors. As of April 2019, no definite reports of an organellar class II release factor can be found.

=== Human genes ===
- RF1 (mitochondrial): MTRF1, MTRF1L, MRPL58 (ICT1), MTRFR (C12orf65)
- eRF1: ETF1
- eRF3: GSPT1, GSPT2

== Structure and function ==
Crystal structures have been solved for bacterial 70S ribosome bound to each of the three release factors, revealing details in codon recognition by RF1/2 and the EF-G-like rotation of RF3. Cryo-EM structures have been obtained for the eukaryotic mammalian 80S ribosome bound to eRF1 and/or eRF3, providing a view of structural rearrangements caused by the factors. Fitting the EM images to previously known crystal structures of individual parts provides identification and a more detailed view of the process.

In both systems, the class II (e)RF3 binds to the universal GTPase site on the ribosome, while the class I RFs occupy the A site.

=== Bacterial ===
The bacterial class 1 release factors can be divided into four domains. The catalytically-important domains are:

- The "tripeptide anticodon" motif in domain 2, P[AV]T in RF1 and SPF in RF2. Only one residue actually participates in stop codon recognition via hydrogen bonding.
- The GGQ motif in domain 3, critical for peptidyl-tRNA hydrolase (PTH) activity.

As RF1/2 sits in the A site of the ribosome, domains 2, 3, and 4 occupy the space that tRNAs load into during elongation. Stop codon recognition activates the RF, promoting a compact to open conformation change, sending the GGQ motif to the peptidyl transferase center (PTC) next to the 3′ end of the P-site tRNA. By hydrolysis of the peptidyl-tRNA ester bond, which displayed pH-dependence in vitro, the peptide is cut loose and released. RF3 is still needed to release RF1/2 from this translation termination complex.

After releasing the peptide, ribosomal recycling is still required to empty the P-site tRNA and mRNA out to make the ribosome usable again. This is done by splitting the ribosome with factors like IF1–IF3 or RRF–EF-G.

=== Eukaryotic and archaeal ===
eRF1 can be broken down into four domains: N-terminal (N), Middle (M), C-terminal (C), plus a minidomain:

- The N domain is responsible for stop codon recognition. Motifs include TASNIKS and YxCxxxF.
- A GGQ motif in the M domain is critical for peptidyl-tRNA hydrolase (PTH) activity.

Unlike in the bacterial version, eRF1–eRF3–GTP binds together into a sub-complex, via a GRFTLRD motif on RF3. Stop codon recognition makes eRF3 hydrolyze the GTP, and the resulting movement puts the GGQ into the PTC to allow for hydrolysis. The movement also causes a +2-nt movement of the toeprint of the pre-termination complex. The archaeal aRF1–EF1α–GTP complex is similar. The triggering mechanism is similar to that of aa-tRNA–EF-Tu–GTP.

A homologous system is Dom34/Pelota–Hbs1, a eukaryotic system that breaks up stalled ribosomes. It does not have GGQ. The recycling and breakup is mediated by ABCE1.
