= Ribosome recycling factor =

Protein found in bacterial cells, mitochondria, and chloroplasts

Identifiers
- Symbol: RRF
- Pfam: PF01765
- InterPro: IPR002661
- CATH: 1ek8
- SCOP2: 1ek8 / SCOPe / SUPFAM
- CDD: cd00520
Available protein structures:
- PDB: IPR002661 PF01765 (ECOD; PDBsum)
- AlphaFold: IPR002661; PF01765

MRRF

Identifiers
- Aliases: MRRF, MRFF, MTRRF, RRF, mitochondrial ribosome recycling factor
- External IDs: OMIM: 604602; MGI: 1915121; GeneCards: MRRF

Gene location (Human)
Chr.	Chromosome 9 (human)
Band	9q33.2	Start	122,264,603 bp
Band	9q33.2	End	122,331,337 bp

Gene location (Mouse)
Chr.	Chromosome 2 (mouse)
Band	2|2 B	Start	36,026,401 bp
Band	2|2 B	End	36,080,659 bp
RNA expression pattern
Bgee	Human / Mouse (ortholog); Top expressed in: rectum; left testis; right testis; mucosa of transverse colon; right uterine tube; gastrocnemius muscle; right lobe of liver; left lobe of thyroid gland; right lobe of thyroid gland; apex of heart / Top expressed in: tail of embryo; genital tubercle; interventricular septum; endothelial cell of lymphatic vessel; Paneth cell; spermatid; external carotid artery; condyle; muscle of thigh; left lobe of liver; More reference expression data
BioGPS	n/a
Gene ontology
Molecular function	ribosomal large subunit binding
Cellular component	mitochondrial matrix; mitochondrion
Biological process	ribosome disassembly; protein biosynthesis; mitochondrial translational termination
Sources:Amigo / QuickGO
Orthologs
Databases	NCBI: entry; OMA: entry
Species	Human	Mouse
Entrez	92399	67871
Ensembl	ENSG00000148187	ENSMUSG00000026887
UniProt	Q96E11	Q9D6S7
RefSeq (mRNA)	NM_001173512; NM_138777; NM_199176; NM_199177; NM_001346339 NM_001346341; NM_001346343; NM_001346345; NM_001346347	NM_026422
RefSeq (protein)	NP_001166983; NP_001333268; NP_001333270; NP_001333272; NP_001333274 NP_001333276; NP_620132; NP_954646	NP_080698
Location (UCSC)	Chr 9: 122.26 – 122.33 Mb	Chr 2: 36.03 – 36.08 Mb
PubMed search
- Wikidata
View/Edit Human	View/Edit Mouse

Ribosome recycling factor or ribosome release factor (RRF) is a protein found in bacterial cells as well as eukaryotic organelles, specifically mitochondria and chloroplasts. It functions to recycle ribosomes after completion of protein synthesis (bacterial translation). In humans, the mitochrondrial version is coded by the MRRF gene.

== Structure ==
The mitochondrial ribosome-recycling factor is a soluble member of the conserved ribosome-recycling factor (RRF) family. The mature mitochondrial form retains the characteristic two-domain, L-shaped/tRNA-mimetic architecture of bacterial RRFs. Its conserved core consists of two domains joined by a flexible hinge. The first an elongated, mainly α-helical domain I that forms one arm of the L, and the second, a smaller domain with a mixed α/β fold that forms the other arm. The hinge allows the two domains to move relative to one another during ribosome recycling. In mitochondria, this conserved core is preceded by an additional N-terminal extension that contributes mitochondria-specific interactions with the mitoribosome.

The crystal structure of RRF was first determined by X-ray diffraction in 1999. The most striking revelation was that RRF is a near-perfect structural mimic of tRNA, in both size and dimensions.

Despite the tRNA-mimicry, RRF binds to ribosomes quite differently from the way tRNA does. It has been suggested that ribosomes bind proteins (or protein domain) of similar shape and size to tRNA, and this, rather than function, explains the observed structural mimicry.

== Function ==
RRF accomplishes the recycling of ribosomes by splitting ribosomes into subunits, thereby releasing the bound mRNA. This also requires the participation of EF-G (GFM2 in humans). Depending on the tRNA, IF1–IF3 may also perform recycling.

=== Loss of RRF function ===
- In Bacteria (specifically Escherichia coli), loss of the gene encoding RRF is deleterious. This makes RRF a possible target for new antibacterial drugs.
- Yeast mitochondrial RRF (mtRRF) is encoded by a gene in the cell nucleus. Loss of function of this gene leads to mitochondrial genome instability and respiratory incompetence.

== Discovery ==
The ribosome recycling factor was discovered in the early 1970s by the work of Akira Kaji and Akikazu Hiroshima at the University of Pennsylvania. Their work described the requirement for two protein factors to release ribosomes from mRNA. These two factors were identified as RRF, an unknown protein until then, and Elongation Factor G (EF-G), a protein already identified and known to function in protein synthesis. RRF was originally called Ribosome Releasing Factor but is now called Ribosome Recycling Factor.

== See also ==
- Ribosome
- Translation (genetics)
- Eukaryotic release factors
