= EF-Ts =

Prokaryotic elongation factor

EF-Ts, bacterial

Identifiers
- Symbol: EF-Ts/EF-1B
- InterPro: IPR001816

EF-Ts dimerisation domain

Identifiers
- Symbol: EF_TS
- Pfam: PF00889
- InterPro: IPR014039
Available protein structures:
- Pfam: structures / ECOD
- PDB: RCSB PDB; PDBe; PDBj
- PDBsum: structure summary

EF-Ts (elongation factor thermo stable) is one of the prokaryotic elongation factors. It is found in human mitochondria as TSFM. It is similar to eukaryotic EF-1B.

EF-Ts serves as the guanine nucleotide exchange factor for EF-Tu (elongation factor thermo unstable), catalyzing the release of guanosine diphosphate from EF-Tu. This enables EF-Tu to bind to a new guanosine triphosphate molecule, release EF-Ts, and go on to catalyze another aminoacyl tRNA addition.

== Structure ==
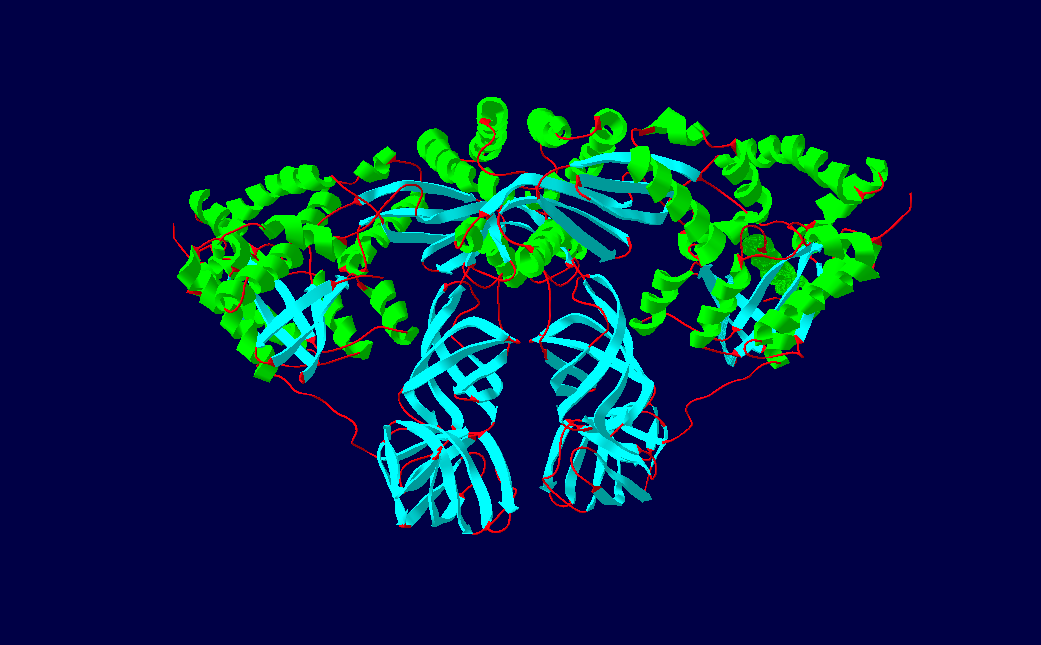
EF-Ts and EF-Tu dimer forming the elongation factor complex full structure

The protein Qβ-Replicase is a tetrameric protein, meaning it contains four subunits. These subunits are the two elongation factors, EF-Tu & EF-Ts, the ribosomal protein subunit S1, and the RNA dependent RNA polymerase β-subunit. The two elongation factors form a heterodimer structure known as the elongation factor complex, which is necessary for the polymerization activity of the RDRP β-Subunit. Its secondary structural components consists of α-helices, β-sheets and β-barrels.

EF-Ts comprises the majority of the top portion of the protein, while EF-Tu makes up the bottom half where the beta barrels are seen. The conformation is considered to be open, when no guanine nucleotide is bound to the active site in EF-Tu. The EF-Ts chain contains four important domains, the C-terminal domain, N-terminal domain, Dimerization domain, and the Core domain which all play a specific role in the protein's structure and functionality. The dimerization domain contains four anti-parallel α-helices which is the main source of contact between EF-Tu and EF-Ts to form the dimer structure

=== Domains ===
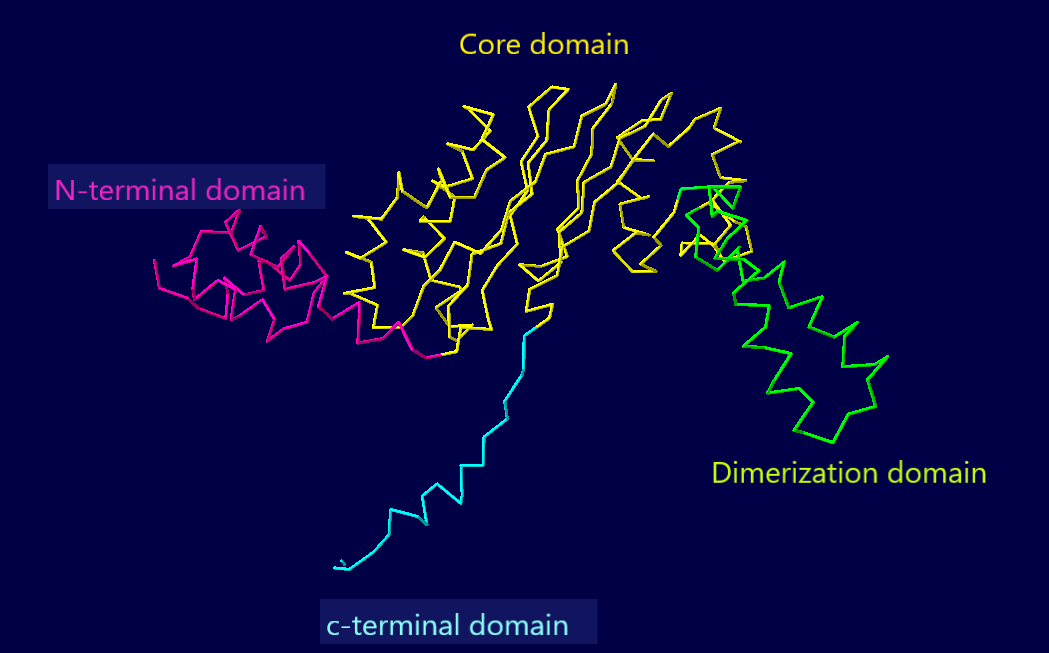
Domains of EF-Ts

The N-terminal domain spans from residues 1-54 (n1-n54), core domain is from n55-n179, the dimerization domain is from n180-n228, and lastly the C-terminal domain that is from n264-n282. The core domain contains two subdomains, C and N, which interact with domains 3 and 1 of EF-Tu respectively.

== Elongation process pathway ==
EF-Ts functions as guanine nucleotide exchange factor, it catalyzes the reaction of EF-Tu*GDP ( inactive form) to EF-Tu*GTP (active). EF-Tu (active) then delivers the aminoacyl-tRNA to the ribosome. Therefore, EF-Ts main role is recycling EF-Tu back to its active state in order to complete another elongation cycle.

The majority of this pathway is performed through conformational changes of EF-Tu domain 1 which contains the active site and manipulation of the switch 1 & 2 regions by the ribosome and tRNA. First, in domain 1 of EF-Tu the GTPase activity site is blocked by a series of hydrophobic residues that block the catalytic residue His 84 in the inactive form prior to activation via EF-Ts. Once the tRNA is bound to EF-Tu, it is then delivered to the Ribosome which hydrolyses the GTP leaving EF-Tu with a lower affinity to bind the tRNA. The ribosome does this through manipulation of the switch 1 region, after GTP hydrolysis the secondary structure switches from primarily α-helices to β-hairpin. EF-Tu is then released from the ribosome in the inactive state completing the cycle until activated once again by EF-Ts.

Helix D of EF-Tu must interact with the N-terminal domain of EF-Ts for guanine nucleotide exchange. A recent study researched the reaction kinetics of the guanine nucleotide exchange by mutating certain residues on helix D of EF-Tu in order to see the primary residues involved in the pathway. Mutation of Leu148 and Glu 152 decreased the rate at which EF-Ts N-terminal domain binds to Helix D significantly, concluding these two residues play an important role in the reaction pathway.

== Amino acid conservation between organisms ==
This article focuses on EF-Ts as it exists in Qβ-bacteriophage; however, many organisms use a similar elongation process with proteins that have nearly the same function as EF-Ts. EF-Ts belongs both to the group of proteins known as guanine nucleotide exchange factors, found in many different biochemical pathways, and also to the tsf superfamily. The majority of the amino acid conservation seen between other organisms is located in the N-terminal domain where EF-Ts bind to EF-Tu and the guanine nucleotide exchange occurs. Below is the alignment of the important N-Terminal domain of EF-Ts as it exists in other organisms.

E. coli:    8-LVKELRERTGAGMMDCKKALT-20 P0A6P1
LacBS:      8-LVAELRKRTEVSITKAREALS-20 B0CRK4 (fungus, mitochondrion)
Bos taurus: 8-LLMKLRRKTGYSFINCKKALE-20 P43896 (mammal, mitochondrion)
Drosophila: 8-ALAALRKKTGYTFANCKKALE-20 Q9VJC7 (insect, mitochondrion)
conservation   :  **.:*   : ..::** 

Conserved amino acids in all four are Leu12 and Arg18 (letters seen in bold above). It can be concluded that these two residues play an important role in the guanine nucleotide exchange since they are the only two completely conserved. In eukaryotes, EF-1 performs the same function, and the mechanism for guanine nucleotide exchange is nearly identical as for EF-Ts despite the structural dissimilarities between the two elongation factors.

== See also ==
- Prokaryotic elongation factors
- EF-Tu (elongation factor thermo unstable)
- EF-G (elongation factor G)
- EF-P (elongation factor P)
- Protein translation
- GTPase
