= Tubulin domain =

Tubulin
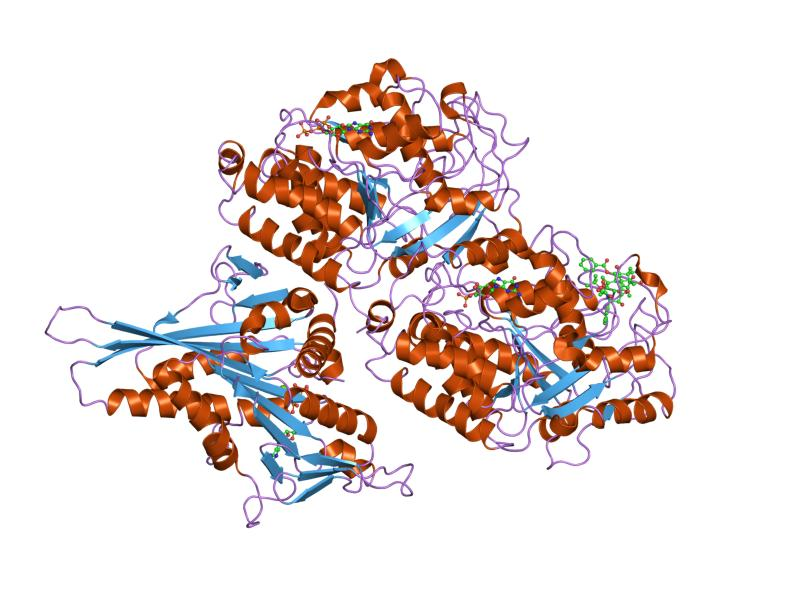
- kif1a head-microtubule complex structure in atp-form

Identifiers
- Symbol: Tubulin
- Pfam: PF00091
- Pfam clan: CL0442
- InterPro: IPR003008
- PROSITE: PDOC00201
- SCOP2: 1tub / SCOPe / SUPFAM
Available protein structures:
- PDB: IPR003008 PF00091 (ECOD; PDBsum)
- AlphaFold: IPR003008; PF00091

Tubulin
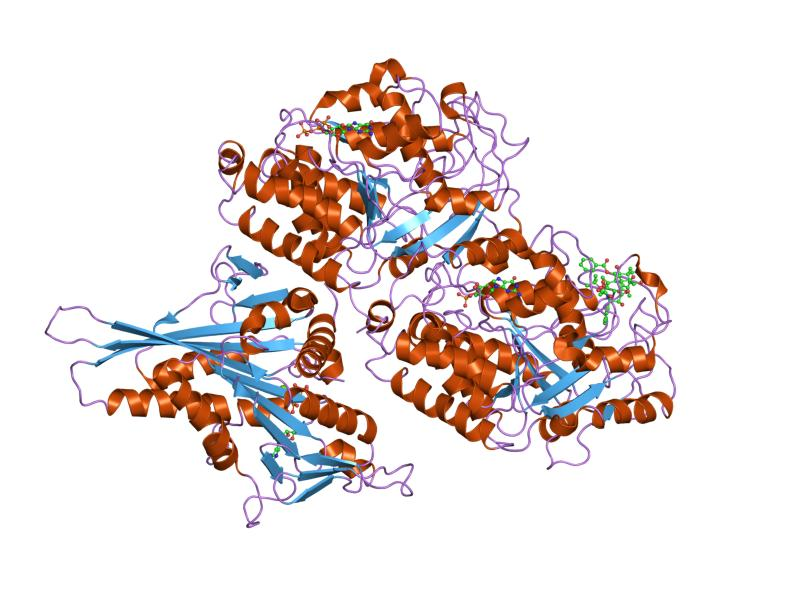
- kif1a head-microtubule complex structure in atp-form

Identifiers
- Symbol: Tubulin
- Pfam: PF00091
- Pfam clan: CL0442
- InterPro: IPR003008
- PROSITE: PDOC00201
- SCOP2: 1tub / SCOPe / SUPFAM
Available protein structures:
- PDB: IPR003008 PF00091 (ECOD; PDBsum)
- AlphaFold: IPR003008; PF00091

Tubulin/FtsZ family, GTPase domain is an evolutionary conserved protein domain.

This domain is found in all tubulin chains, as well as the bacterial FtsZ family of proteins. These proteins are involved in polymer formation. Tubulin is the major component of microtubules, while FtsZ is the polymer-forming protein of bacterial cell division, it is part of a ring in the middle of the dividing cell that is required for constriction of cell membrane and cell envelope to yield two daughter cells. FtsZ and tubulin are GTPases, this entry is the GTPase domain. FtsZ can polymerise into tubes, sheets, and rings in vitro and is ubiquitous in bacteria and archaea.
