= Aminoacyl-tRNA =

Molecule that delivers the amino acid to the ribosome during translation

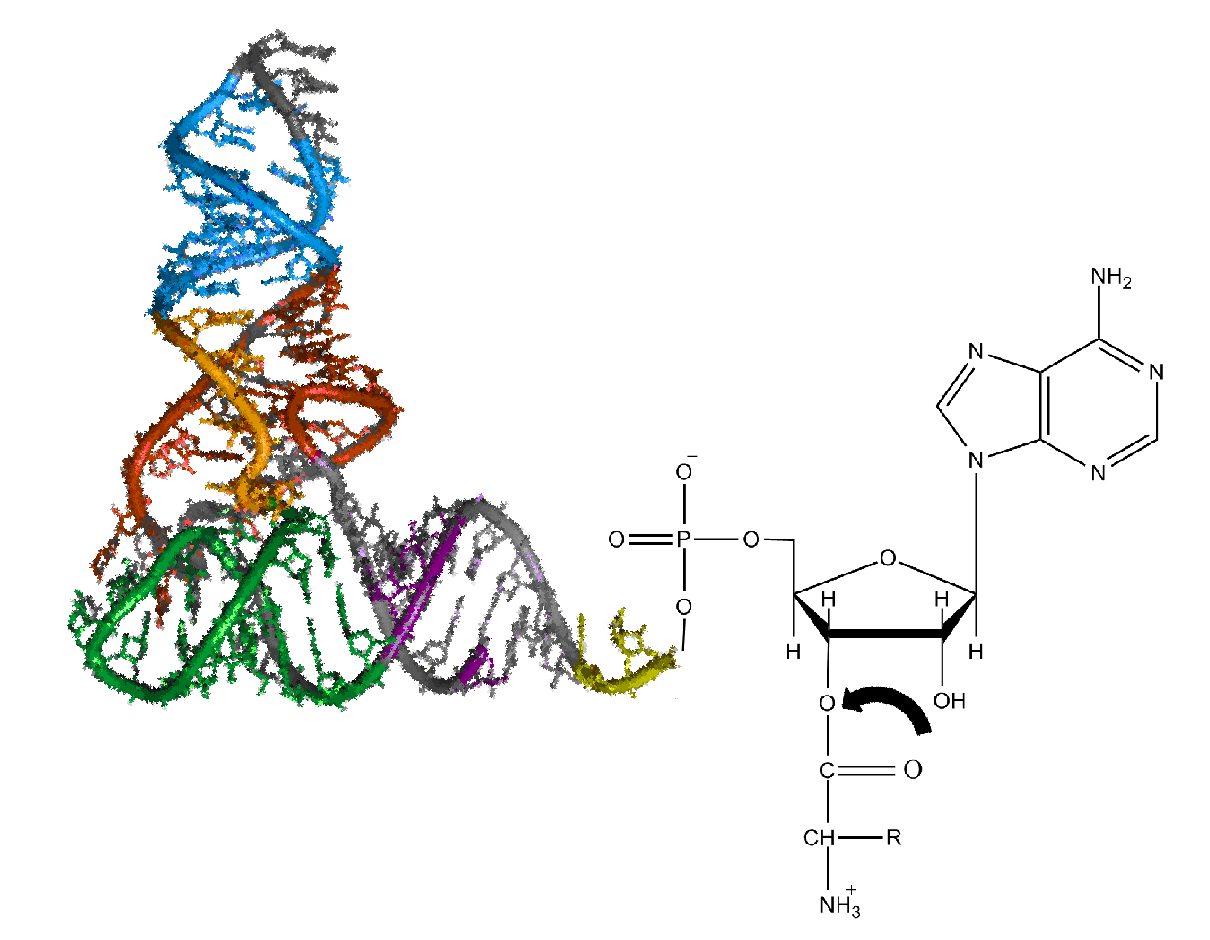
An aminoacyl-tRNA, with the tRNA above the arrow and a generic amino acid below the arrow. Most of the tRNA structure is shown as a simplified, colorful ball-and-stick model; the terminal adenosine and the amino acid are shown as structural formulas. The arrow indicates the ester linkage between the amino acid and tRNA.

Aminoacyl-tRNA (also aa-tRNA or charged tRNA) is tRNA to which its cognate amino acid is chemically bonded (charged). The aa-tRNA, along with particular elongation factors, deliver the amino acid to the ribosome for incorporation into the polypeptide chain that is being produced during translation.

Alone, an amino acid is not the substrate necessary to allow for the formation of peptide bonds within a growing polypeptide chain. Instead, amino acids must be "charged" or aminoacylated with a tRNA to form their respective aa-tRNA. Every amino acid has its own specific aminoacyl-tRNA synthetase, which is utilized to chemically bind to the tRNA that it is specific to, or in other words, "cognate" to. The pairing of a tRNA with its cognate amino acid is crucial, as it ensures that only the particular amino acid matching the anticodon of the tRNA, and in turn matching the codon of the mRNA, is used during protein synthesis.

In order to prevent translational errors, in which the wrong amino acid is incorporated into the polypeptide chain, evolution has provided for proofreading functionalities of aa-tRNA synthetases; these mechanisms ensure the proper pairing of an amino acid to its cognate tRNA. Amino acids that are misacylated with the proper tRNA substrate undergo hydrolysis through the deacylation mechanisms possessed by aa-tRNA synthetases.

Due to the degeneracy of the genetic code, multiple tRNAs will have the same amino acid but different anticodons. These different tRNAs are called isoacceptors. Under certain circumstances, non-cognate amino acids will be charged, resulting in mischarged or misaminoacylated tRNA. These mischarged tRNAs must be hydrolyzed in order to prevent incorrect protein synthesis.

While aa-tRNA serves primarily as the intermediate link between the mRNA coding strand and the encoded polypeptide chain during protein synthesis, it is also found that aa-tRNA have functions in several other biosynthetic pathways. aa-tRNAs are found to function as substrates in biosynthetic pathways for cell walls, antibiotics, lipids, and protein degradation.

It is understood that aa-tRNAs may function as donors of amino acids necessary for the modification of lipids and the biosynthesis of antibiotics. For example, microbial biosynthetic gene clusters may utilize aa-tRNAs in the synthesis of non-ribosomal peptides and other amino acid-containing metabolites.

== Synthesis ==
Aminoacyl-tRNA is produced in two steps. First, the adenylation of the amino acid, which forms aminoacyl-AMP:

Amino Acid + ATP → Aminoacyl-AMP + PP_{i}

Second, the amino acid residue is transferred to the tRNA:

Aminoacyl-AMP + tRNA → Aminoacyl-tRNA + AMP

The overall net reaction is:

Amino Acid + ATP + tRNA → Aminoacyl-tRNA + AMP + PP_{i}

The net reaction is energetically favorable only because the pyrophosphate (PPi) is later hydrolyzed. The hydrolysis of pyrophosphate to two molecules of inorganic phosphate (Pi) reaction is highly energetically favorable and drives the other two reactions. Together, these highly exergonic reactions take place inside the aminoacyl-tRNA synthetase specific for that amino acid.

== Stability and hydrolysis ==
Research into the stability of aa-tRNAs illustrates that the acyl (or ester) linkage is the most important conferring factor, as opposed to the sequence of the tRNA itself. This linkage is an ester bond that chemically binds the carboxyl group of an amino acid to the terminal 3'-OH group of its cognate tRNA. It has been discovered that the amino acid moiety of a given aa-tRNA provides for its structural integrity; the tRNA moiety dictates, for the most part, how and when the amino acid will be incorporated into a growing polypeptide chain.

The different aa-tRNAs have varying pseudo-first-order rate constants for the hydrolysis of the ester bond between the amino acid and tRNA. Such observations are due to, primarily, steric effects. Steric hindrance is provided for by specific side chain groups of amino acids, which aids in inhibiting intermolecular attacks on the ester carbonyl; these intermolecular attacks are responsible for hydrolyzing the ester bond.

Branched and aliphatic amino acids (valine and isoleucine) prove to generate the most stable aminoacyl-tRNAs upon their synthesis, with notably longer half lives than those that possess low hydrolytic stability (for example, proline). The steric hindrance of valine and isoleucine amino acids is generated by the methyl group on the β-carbon of the side chain. Overall, the chemical nature of the bound amino acid is responsible for determining the stability of the aa-tRNA.

Increased ionic strength resulting from sodium, potassium, and magnesium salts has been shown to destabilize the aa-tRNA acyl bond. Increased pH also destabilizes the bond and changes the ionization of the α-carbon amino group of the amino acid. The charged amino group can destabilize the aa-tRNA bond via the inductive effect. The elongation factor EF-Tu has been shown to stabilize the bond by preventing weak acyl linkages from being hydrolyzed.

All together, the actual stability of the ester bond influences the susceptibility of the aa-tRNA to hydrolysis within the body at physiological pH and ion concentrations. It is thermodynamically favorable that the aminoacylation process yield a stable aa-tRNA molecule, thus providing for the acceleration and productivity of polypeptide synthesis.

== Drug targeting ==
Certain antibiotics, such as tetracyclines, prevent the aminoacyl-tRNA from binding to the ribosomal subunit in prokaryotes. It is understood that tetracyclines inhibit the attachment of aa-tRNA within the acceptor (A) site of prokaryotic ribosomes during translation. Tetracyclines are considered broad-spectrum antibiotic agents; these drugs exhibit capabilities of inhibiting the growth of both gram-positive and gram-negative bacteria, as well as other atypical microorganisms.

Furthermore, the TetM protein (P21598) is found to allow aminoacyl-tRNA molecules to bind to the ribosomal acceptor site, despite being concentrated with tetracyclines that would typically inhibit such actions. The TetM protein is regarded as a ribosomal protection protein, exhibiting GTPase activity that is dependent upon ribosomes. Research has demonstrated that in the presence of TetM proteins, tetracyclines are released from ribosomes. Thus, this allows for aa-tRNA binding to the A site of ribosomes, as it is no longer precluded by tetracycline molecules. TetO is 75% similar to TetM, and both have some 45% similarity with EF-G. The structure of TetM in complex with E. coli ribosome has been resolved.

== See also ==
- Aminoacyl tRNA synthetase
