= TSFM =

Protein-coding gene in the species Homo sapiens

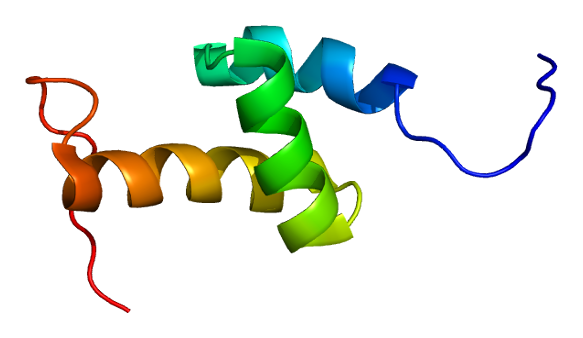
Available structures
PDB	Ortholog search: PDBe RCSB
PDB	List of PDB id codes 2CP9

Identifiers
- Aliases: TSFM, EFTS, EFTSMT, Ts translation elongation factor, mitochondrial
- External IDs: OMIM: 604723; MGI: 1913649; HomoloGene: 4184; GeneCards: TSFM; OMA:TSFM - orthologs

Gene location (Human)
Chr.	Chromosome 12 (human)
Band	12q14.1	Start	57,782,761 bp
Band	12q14.1	End	57,808,071 bp

Gene location (Mouse)
Chr.	Chromosome 10 (mouse)
Band	10|10 D3	Start	126,847,441 bp
Band	10|10 D3	End	126,866,709 bp
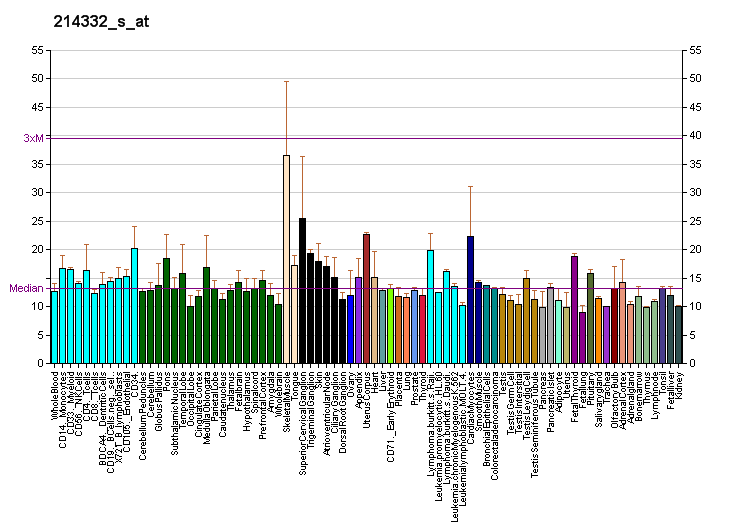

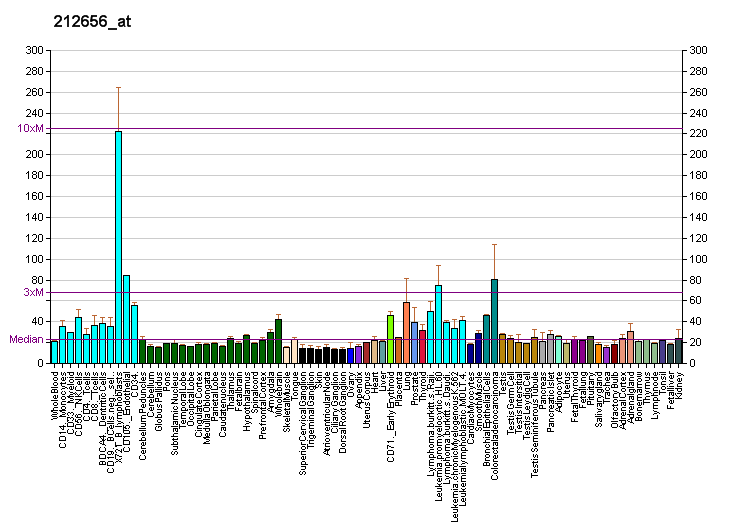

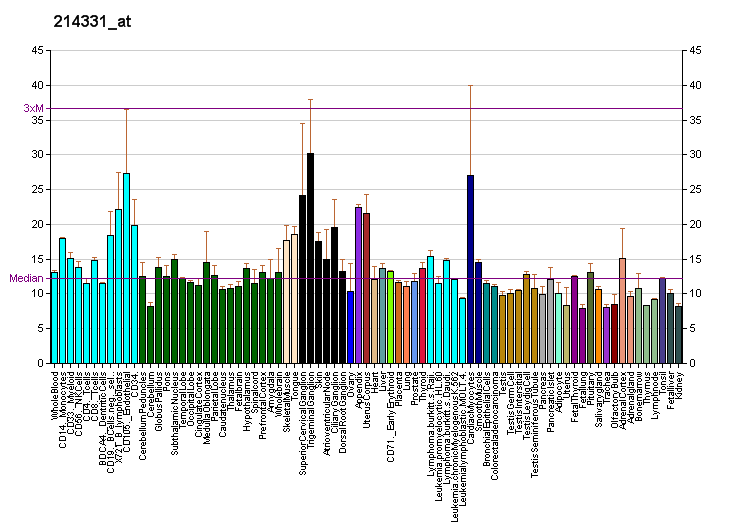
RNA expression pattern
Bgee	Human / Mouse (ortholog); Top expressed in: right adrenal gland; left adrenal gland; right adrenal cortex; left adrenal cortex; gonad; skeletal muscle tissue; gastrocnemius muscle; islet of Langerhans; left ventricle; mucosa of transverse colon / Top expressed in: right kidney; interventricular septum; yolk sac; embryo; embryo; proximal tubule; stomach; epiblast; endocardial cushion; hand; More reference expression data
BioGPS	More reference expression data
Gene ontology
Molecular function	translation elongation factor activity; RNA binding; protein binding
Cellular component	mitochondrial matrix; intracellular anatomical structure; mitochondrion; nucleus
Biological process	translational elongation; regulation of DNA-templated transcription, elongation; protein biosynthesis; mitochondrial translational elongation; regulation of mitochondrial translation
Sources:Amigo / QuickGO
Orthologs
Species	Human	Mouse
Entrez	10102	66399
Ensembl	ENSG00000123297	ENSMUSG00000040521
UniProt	P43897	Q9CZR8
RefSeq (mRNA)	NM_005726; NM_001172695; NM_001172696; NM_001172697	NM_025537
RefSeq (protein)	NP_001166166; NP_001166167; NP_001166168; NP_005717	NP_079813
Location (UCSC)	Chr 12: 57.78 – 57.81 Mb	Chr 10: 126.85 – 126.87 Mb
PubMed search
- Wikidata
View/Edit Human	View/Edit Mouse

Elongation factor Ts, mitochondrial is a protein that in humans is encoded by the TSFM gene. It is an EF-Ts homolog.
