= Misato segment II myosin-like domain =

Misat_Myo_SegII

Identifiers
- Symbol: Misat_Myo_SegII
- Pfam: PF10644
- Pfam clan: CL0442
- InterPro: IPR019605
Available protein structures:
- Pfam: structures / ECOD
- PDB: RCSB PDB; PDBe; PDBj
- PDBsum: structure summary

The Misato segment II myosin-like domain is an evolutionary conserved protein domain. The misato protein contains three distinct, conserved domains, segments I, II and III and is involved in the regulation of mitochondrial distribution and morphology.

Segments I and III are common to tubulins (INTERPRO), but segment II aligns with myosin heavy chain sequences from Drosophila melanogaster (Fruit fly, SWISSPROT), rabbit (SWISSPROT), and human.

Segment II of misato is a major contributor to its greater length compared with the various tubulins. The most significant sequence similarities to this 54-amino acid region are from a motif found in the heavy chains of myosins from different organisms. A comparison of segment II with the vertebrate myosin heavy chains reveals that it is homologous to a myosin peptide in the hinge region linking the S2 and LMM domains. Segment II also contains heptad repeats which are characteristic of the myosin tail alpha-helical coiled-coils.

Deletion of the budding yeast homologue is lethal and unregulated expression leads to mitochondrial dispersion and abnormalities in cell morphology. The group of proteins containing this domain is conserved from yeast to human, but its exact function is still unknown.
