= Signal peptidase I =

Identifiers
- EC no.: 3.4.21.89
- CAS no.: 65979-36-4

Databases
- IntEnz: IntEnz view
- BRENDA: BRENDA entry
- ExPASy: NiceZyme view
- KEGG: KEGG entry
- MetaCyc: metabolic pathway
- PRIAM: profile
- PDB structures: RCSB PDB PDBe PDBsum
Search
- PMC: articles
- PubMed: articles
- NCBI: proteins

Signal peptidase I (EC 3.4.21.89, leader peptidase I, signal proteinase, Escherichia coli leader peptidase, eukaryotic signal peptidase, eukaryotic signal proteinase, leader peptidase, leader peptide hydrolase, leader proteinase, signal peptidase, pilin leader peptidase, SPC, prokaryotic signal peptidase, prokaryotic leader peptidase, HOSP, prokaryotic signal proteinase, propeptidase, PuIO prepilin peptidase, signal peptide hydrolase, signal peptide peptidase, signalase, bacterial leader peptidase 1) is an enzyme. This enzyme catalyses the following chemical reaction

Cleavage of hydrophobic, N-terminal signal or leader sequences

This enzyme is present in bacterial membranes and in chloroplast thylakoid membranes.
