= TUFM =

Mitochondrial protein and coding gene in humans

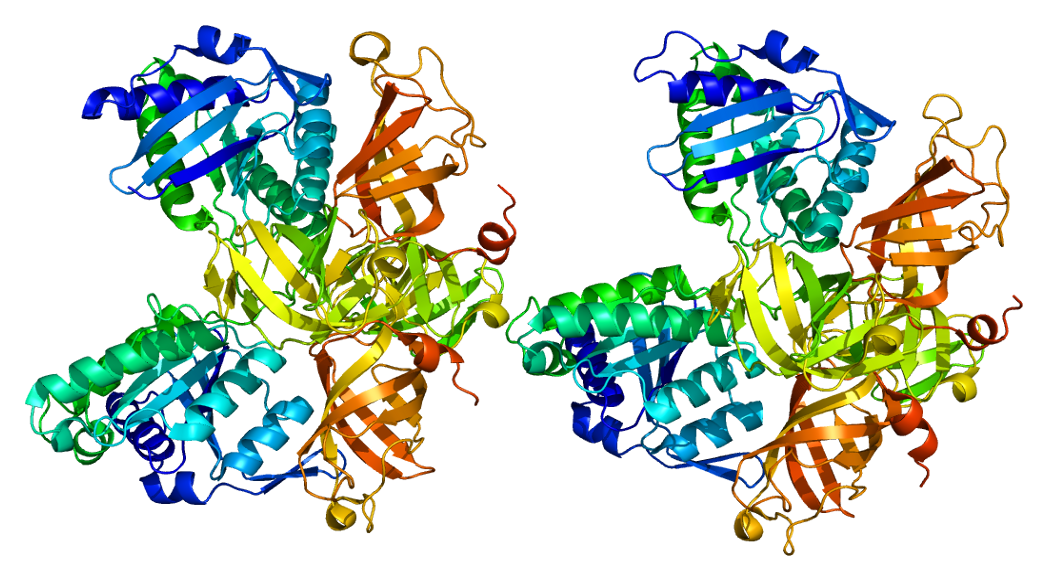

Identifiers
- Aliases: TUFM, COXPD4, EF-TuMT, EFTU, P43, Tu translation elongation factor, mitochondrial
- External IDs: OMIM: 602389; MGI: 1923686; GeneCards: TUFM
Enzyme activity
EC #	BRENDA	ExPASy	KEGG	MetaCyc
3.6.5.3	↗	↗	↗	↗

Gene location (Human)
Chr.	Chromosome 16 (human)
Band	16p11.2	Start	28,842,411 bp
Band	16p11.2	End	28,846,348 bp

Gene location (Mouse)
Chr.	Chromosome 7 (mouse)
Band	7|7 F3	Start	126,086,533 bp
Band	7|7 F3	End	126,089,903 bp
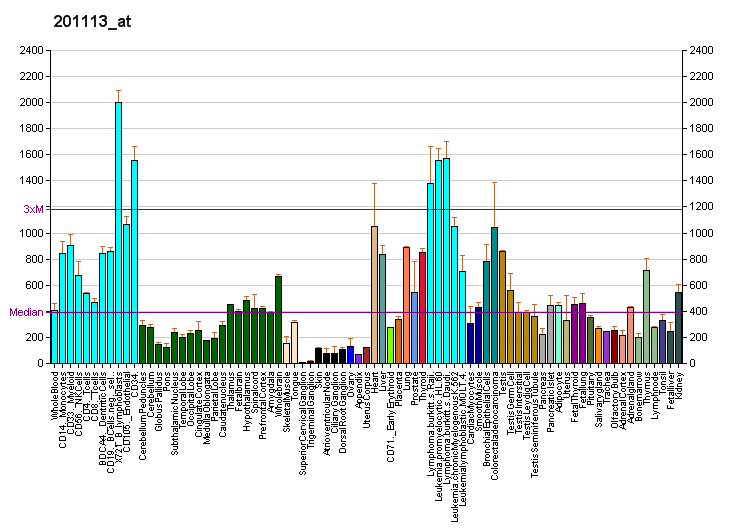
RNA expression pattern
Bgee	Human / Mouse (ortholog); Top expressed in: mucosa of transverse colon; apex of heart; right adrenal gland; left adrenal gland; body of pancreas; body of stomach; right adrenal cortex; left adrenal cortex; olfactory zone of nasal mucosa; granulocyte / Top expressed in: right kidney; muscle of thigh; neural layer of retina; yolk sac; lip; embryo; dentate gyrus of hippocampal formation granule cell; ventricular zone; embryo; blastocyst; More reference expression data
BioGPS	More reference expression data
Gene ontology
Molecular function	nucleotide binding; GTP binding; protein binding; translation elongation factor activity; RNA binding; GTPase activity
Cellular component	mitochondrial nucleoid; extracellular exosome; intracellular anatomical structure; mitochondrion; membrane; mitochondrial inner membrane; myelin sheath; synapse
Biological process	translational elongation; protein biosynthesis; response to ethanol; mitochondrial translational elongation
Sources:Amigo / QuickGO
Orthologs
Databases	NCBI: entry; OMA: entry
Species	Human	Mouse
Entrez	7284	233870
Ensembl	ENSG00000178952	ENSMUSG00000073838
UniProt	P49411	Q8BFR5
RefSeq (mRNA)	NM_003321; NM_001365360	NM_001163713; NM_172745
RefSeq (protein)	NP_003312; NP_001352289	NP_001157185; NP_766333
Location (UCSC)	Chr 16: 28.84 – 28.85 Mb	Chr 7: 126.09 – 126.09 Mb
PubMed search
- Wikidata
View/Edit Human	View/Edit Mouse

Elongation factor Tu, mitochondrial is a protein that in humans is encoded by the TUFM gene. It is an EF-Tu homolog.
