= Ternary complex =

Protein complex among three different molecules

A ternary complex is a protein complex containing three different molecules that are bound together. In structural biology, ternary complex can also be used to describe a crystal containing a protein with two small molecules bound, such as a cofactor and a substrate; or a complex formed between two proteins and a single substrate. In immunology, ternary complex can refer to the MHC–peptide–T-cell-receptor complex formed when T cells recognize epitopes of an antigen. Another important example is the ternary complex formed during eukaryotic translation (the prokaryotic equivalent is also called a ternary complex), in which ternary complex composed of eIF2 + GTP + Met-tRNA_{i}^{Met} is formed. A ternary complex can be a complex formed between two substrate molecules and an enzyme. This is seen in multi-substrate enzyme-catalyzed reactions where two substrates and two products can be formed. The ternary complex is an intermediate species in this type of enzyme-catalyzed reaction. An example for a ternary complex is seen in the random-order mechanism or the compulsory-order mechanism of enzyme catalysis for multiple substrates.

The term ternary complex can also refer to a polymer formed by electrostatic interactions.
