= GFM1 =

Protein-coding gene in the species Homo sapiens

Identifiers
- Aliases: GFM1, COXPD1, EFG, EFG1, EFGM, EGF1, GFM, hEFG1, G elongation factor, mitochondrial 1, G elongation factor mitochondrial 1, mtEF-G1
- External IDs: OMIM: 606639; MGI: 107339; GeneCards: GFM1

Gene location (Human)
Chr.	Chromosome 3 (human)
Band	3q25.32	Start	158,644,278 bp
Band	3q25.32	End	158,692,575 bp

Gene location (Mouse)
Chr.	Chromosome 3 (mouse)
Band	3 E1|3 30.96 cM	Start	67,337,429 bp
Band	3 E1|3 30.96 cM	End	67,383,862 bp
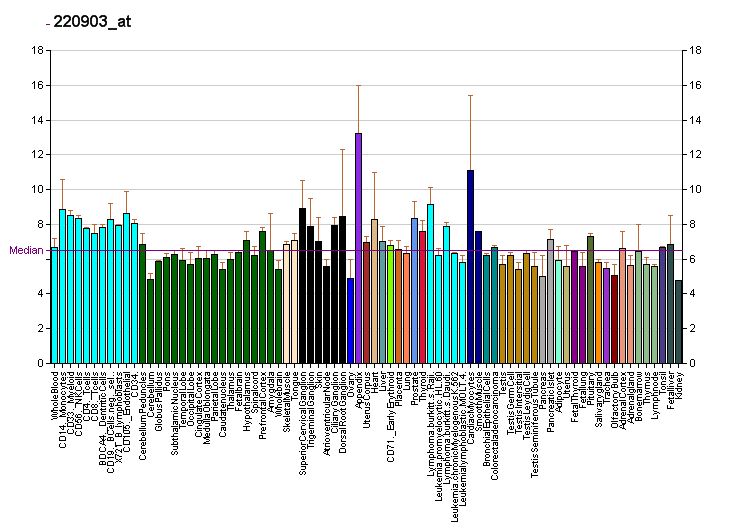
RNA expression pattern
Bgee	Human / Mouse (ortholog); Top expressed in: endothelial cell; biceps brachii; Brodmann area 23; Skeletal muscle tissue of biceps brachii; retinal pigment epithelium; Skeletal muscle tissue of rectus abdominis; right ventricle; germinal epithelium; mucosa of sigmoid colon; parietal pleura / Top expressed in: myocardium of ventricle; otic placode; right kidney; cardiac muscles; cardiac muscle tissue of left ventricle; digastric muscle; masseter muscle; right ventricle; proximal tubule; temporal muscle; More reference expression data
BioGPS	More reference expression data
Gene ontology
Molecular function	nucleotide binding; GTP binding; protein binding; GTPase activity; translation elongation factor activity; RNA binding
Cellular component	mitochondrial matrix; intracellular anatomical structure; mitochondrion
Biological process	translational elongation; protein biosynthesis; mitochondrial translational elongation
Sources:Amigo / QuickGO
Orthologs
Databases	NCBI: entry; OMA: entry
Species	Human	Mouse
Entrez	85476	28030
Ensembl	ENSG00000168827	ENSMUSG00000027774
UniProt	Q96RP9	Q8K0D5
RefSeq (mRNA)	NM_001308164; NM_001308166; NM_024996	NM_138591
RefSeq (protein)	NP_001295093; NP_001295095; NP_079272; NP_001361284; NP_001361285 NP_001361286; NP_001361287; NP_001361288; NP_001361289; NP_001361290	NP_613057
Location (UCSC)	Chr 3: 158.64 – 158.69 Mb	Chr 3: 67.34 – 67.38 Mb
PubMed search
- Wikidata
View/Edit Human	View/Edit Mouse

Elongation factor G 1, mitochondrial is a protein that in humans is encoded by the GFM1 gene. It is an EF-G homolog.

Eukaryotes contain two protein translational systems, one in the cytoplasm and one in the mitochondria. Mitochondrial translation is crucial for maintaining mitochondrial function and mutations in this system lead to a breakdown in the respiratory chain-oxidative phosphorylation system and to impaired maintenance of mitochondrial DNA. This gene encodes one of the mitochondrial translation elongation factors. Its role in the regulation of normal mitochondrial function and in different disease states attributed to mitochondrial dysfunction is not known.
