= EF-G =

Prokaryotic elongation factor

Protein-synthesizing GTPase
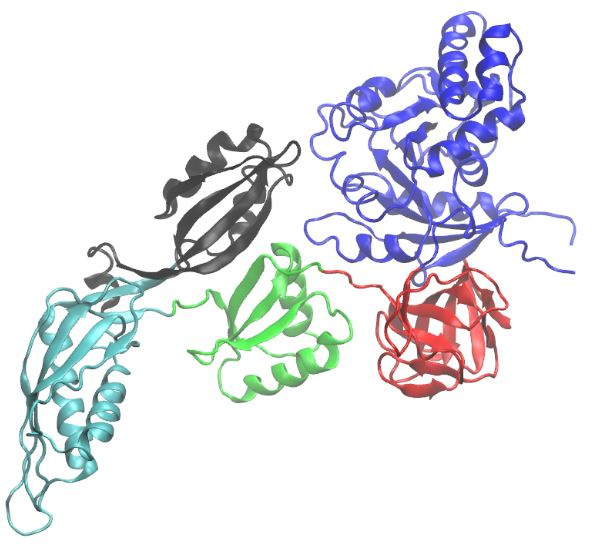

Identifiers
- EC no.: 3.6.5.3
- Alt. names: Elongation factor G, EF-G

Databases
- BRENDA: enzyme data
- ExPASy: NiceZyme view
- KEGG: enzyme entry
- MetaCyc: metabolic pathway
- Rhea: reactions
- PDB structures: RCSB PDB PDBe PDBsum
Search
- PMC: articles
- PubMed: articles
- NCBI: proteins

Translation elongation factor EFG/EF2

Identifiers
- Symbol: Transl_elong_EFG/EF2
- InterPro: IPR004540
- SCOP2: 1n0u / SCOPe / SUPFAM
Available protein structures:
- PDB: IPR004540
- AlphaFold: IPR004540

EFG/EF2, domain IV

Identifiers
- Symbol: EFG_IV
- Pfam: PF03764
- Pfam clan: CL0329
- SMART: SM00889
- CDD: cd01434
Available protein structures:
- PDB: PF03764 (ECOD; PDBsum)
- AlphaFold: PF03764

EF-G (elongation factor G, historically known as translocase) is a prokaryotic elongation factor involved in mRNA translation. As a GTPase, EF-G catalyzes the movement (translocation) of transfer RNA (tRNA) and messenger RNA (mRNA) through the ribosome.

== Structure ==
Encoded by the fusA gene on the str operon, EF-G is made up of 704 amino acids that form 5 domains, labeled Domain I through Domain V. Domain I may be referred to as the G-domain or as Domain I(G), since it binds to and hydrolyzes guanosine triphosphate (GTP). Domain I also helps EF-G bind to the ribosome, and contains the N-terminal of the polypeptide chain. Domain IV is important for translocation, as it undergoes a significant conformational change and enters the A site on the 30S ribosomal subunit, pushing the mRNA and tRNA molecules from the A site to the P site.

The five domains may be also separated into two super-domains. Super-domain I consists of Domains I and II, and super-domain II consists of Domains III - IV. Throughout translocation, super-domain I will remain relatively unchanged, as it is responsible for binding tightly to the ribosome. However, super-domain II will undergo a large rotational motion from the pre-translocational (PRE) state to the post-translocational (POST) state. Super-domain I is similar to the corresponding sections of EF-Tu. Super-domain II in the POST state mimics the tRNA molecule of the EF-Tu • GTP • aa-tRNA ternary complex.

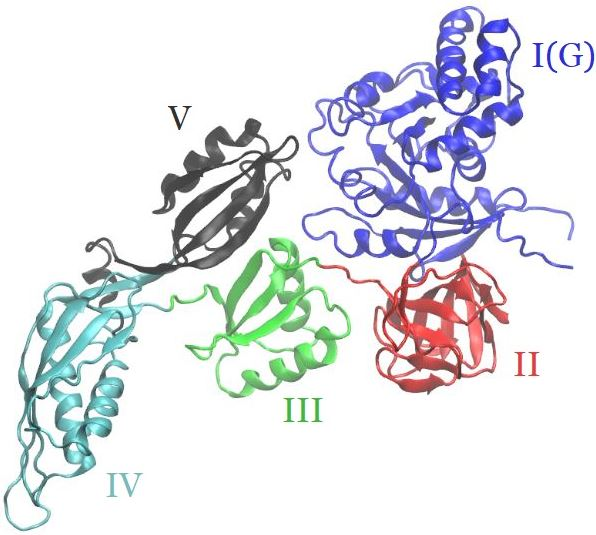
Crystal structure of EF-G in the POST state with Domains I - V labeled. PDB ID: 4V5F

=== EF-G on the ribosome ===
==== Binding to L7/L12 ====
L7/L12 is only a multicopy protein on the large ribosomal subunit of the bacterial ribosome that binds to certain GTPases, like Initiation Factor 2, Elongation factor-Tu, Release Factor 3, and EF-G. Specifically, the C-terminal of L7/L12 will bind to EF-G and is necessary for GTP hydrolysis.

==== Interaction with the GTPase Associated Center ====
The GTPase Associated Center (GAC) is a region on the large ribosomal subunit that consists of two smaller regions of 23S ribosomal RNA called the L11 stalk and the sarcin-ricin loop (SRL). As a highly conserved rRNA loop in evolution, the SRL is critical in helping GTPases bind to the ribosome, but is not essential for GTP hydrolysis. There is some evidence to support that a phosphate oxygen in the A2662 residue of the SRL may help hydrolyze GTP.

Animation of the 70S ribosome with the P site tRNA (orange), E site tRNA (green), mRNA (yellow), and elongation factor G (red) in the POST state. PDB ID: 4W29

== Function in protein elongation ==
EF-G catalyzes the translocation of the tRNA and mRNA down the ribosome at the end of each round of polypeptide elongation. In this process, the peptidyl transferase center (PTC) has catalyzed the formation of a peptide bond between amino acids, moving the polypeptide chain from the P site tRNA to the A site tRNA. The 50S and 30S ribosomal subunits are now allowed to rotate relative to each other by approximately 7°. The subunit rotation is coupled with the movement of the 3' ends of both tRNA molecules on the large subunit from the A and P sites to the P and E sites, respectively, while the anticodon loops remain unshifted. This rotated ribosomal intermediate, in which the first tRNA occupies a hybrid A/P position and the second tRNA occupies a hybrid P/E position is a substrate for EF-G-GTP.

As a GTPase, EF-G binds to the rotated ribosome near the A site in its GTP-bound state, and hydrolyzes GTP, releasing GDP and inorganic phosphate:

$$\ce{GTP + H2O -> GDP + P_{i}}$$

The hydrolysis of GTP allows for a large conformational change within EF-G, forcing the A/P tRNA to fully occupy the P site, the P/E tRNA to fully occupy the E site (and exit the ribosome complex), and the mRNA to shift three nucleotides down relative to the ribosome. The GDP-bound EF-G molecule then dissociates from the complex, leaving another free A-site where the elongation cycle can start again.

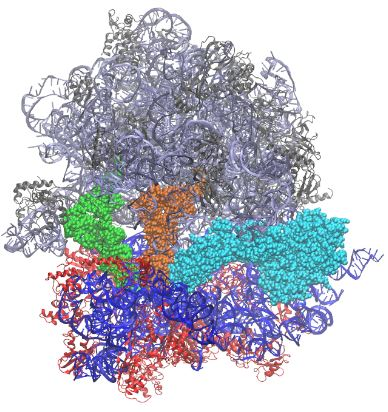
Crystal structure of the ribosome with two tRNAs (orange and green) and EF-G (in cyan) after translocation. PDB ID: 4W29.

== Function in protein termination ==
Protein elongation continues until a stop codon appears on the mRNA. A Class I release factor (RF1 or RF2) binds to the stop codon, which induces hydrolysis of the tRNA-peptide bond in the P site, allowing the newly-formed protein to exit the ribosome. The nascent peptide continues to fold and leaves the 70S ribosome, the mRNA, the deacylated tRNA (P site), and the Class I release factor (A site).

In a GTP-dependent manner, the subsequent recycling is catalyzed by a Class II release factor named RF3/prfC, Ribosome recycling factor (RRF), Initiation Factor 3 (IF3) and EF-G. The protein RF3 releases the Class I release factor so that it may occupy the ribosomal A site. EF-G hydrolyzes GTP and undergoes a large conformational change to push RF3 down the ribosome, which occurs alongside tRNA dissociation and promotes the ribosomal subunit rotation. This motion actively splits the B2a/B2b bridge, which connects the 30S and the 50S subunits, so that the ribosome can split. IF3 then isolates the 30S subunit to prevent re-association of the large and small subunits.

== Clinical significance ==
EF-G in pathogenic bacteria can be inhibited by antibiotics that prevent EF-G from binding to the ribosome, carrying out translocation or dissociating from the ribosome.

For example, the antibiotic thiostrepton prevents EF-G from binding stably to the ribosome, while the antibiotics dityromycin and GE82832 inhibit the activity of EF-G by preventing the translocation of the A site tRNA. Dityromycin and GE82832 do not affect the binding of EF-G to the ribosome, however.

The antibiotic fusidic acid is known to inhibit Staphylococcus aureus and other bacteria by binding to EF-G after one translocation event on the ribosome, preventing EF-G from dissociating. However, some bacterial strains have developed resistance to fusidic acid due to point mutations in the fusA gene, which prevents fusidic acid from binding to EF-G.

== Evolution ==
EF-G has a complex evolutionary history, with numerous paralogous versions of the factor present in bacteria, suggesting subfunctionalization of different EF-G variants.

Elongation factors exist in all three domains of life with similar function on the ribosome. The eukaryotic and archeal homologs of EF-G are eEF2 and aEF2, respectively. In bacteria (and some archaea), the fusA gene that encodes EF-G is found within the conserved str gene with the sequence 5′ - rpsL - rpsG - fusA - tufA - 3′. However, two other major forms of EF-G exist in some species of Spirochaetota, Planctomycetota, and δ-Proteobacteria (which has since been split and renamed Bdellovibrionota, Myxococcota, and Thermodesulfobacteriota), which form the spd group of bacteria that have elongation factors spdEFG1 and spdEFG2.

From spdEFG1 and spdEFG2 evolved the mitochondrial elongation factors mtEFG1 (GFM1) and mtEFG2 (GFM2), respectively. The two roles of EF-G in elongation and termination of protein translation are split amongst the mitochondrial elongation factors, with mtEFG1 responsible for translocation and mtEFG2 responsible for termination and ribosomal recycling with mitochondrial RRF.

== See also ==
- Prokaryotic elongation factors
- EF-Ts (elongation factor thermo stable)
- EF-Tu (elongation factor thermo unstable)
- EF-P (elongation factor P)
- eEF2 (eukaryotic elongation factor 2)
- Protein translation
- GTPase
