= GTPase =

Class of enzymes

Signaling enzymes that bind to and catalyze the conversion of the nucleotide guanosine triphosphate (GTP) to guanosine diphosphate (GDP). GTPases are deactivated when GTP is converted to GDP.

GTPases are a large family of hydrolase enzymes that bind to the nucleotide guanosine triphosphate (GTP) and hydrolyze it to guanosine diphosphate (GDP). The GTP binding and hydrolysis takes place in the highly conserved P-loop "G domain", a protein domain common to many GTPases.

== Functions ==
GTPases function as molecular switches or timers in many fundamental cellular processes.

Examples of these roles include:

- Signal transduction in response to activation of cell surface receptors, including transmembrane receptors such as those mediating taste, smell and vision.
- Protein biosynthesis (a.k.a. translation) at the ribosome.
- Regulation of cell differentiation, proliferation, division and movement.
- Translocation of proteins through membranes.
- Transport of vesicles within the cell, and vesicle-mediated secretion and uptake, through GTPase control of vesicle coat assembly.

GTPases are active when bound to GTP and inactive when bound to GDP. In the generalized receptor-transducer-effector signaling model of Martin Rodbell, signaling GTPases act as transducers to regulate the activity of effector proteins. This inactive-active switch is due to conformational changes in the protein distinguishing these two forms, particularly of the "switch" regions that in the active state are able to make protein-protein contacts with partner proteins that alter the function of these effectors.

== Mechanism ==
Hydrolysis of GTP bound to an (active) G domain-GTPase leads to deactivation of the signaling/timer function of the enzyme. The hydrolysis of the third (γ) phosphate of GTP to create guanosine diphosphate (GDP) and P_{i}, inorganic phosphate, occurs by the S_{N}2 mechanism (see nucleophilic substitution) via a pentacoordinate transition state and is dependent on the presence of a magnesium ion Mg^{2+}.

GTPase activity serves as the shutoff mechanism for the signaling roles of GTPases by returning the active, GTP-bound protein to the inactive, GDP-bound state. Most "GTPases" have functional GTPase activity, allowing them to remain active (that is, bound to GTP) only for a short time before deactivating themselves by converting bound GTP to bound GDP. However, many GTPases also use accessory proteins named GTPase-activating proteins or GAPs to accelerate their GTPase activity. This further limits the active lifetime of signaling GTPases. Some GTPases have little to no intrinsic GTPase activity, and are entirely dependent on GAP proteins for deactivation (such as the ADP-ribosylation factor or ARF family of small GTP-binding proteins that are involved in vesicle-mediated transport within cells).

To become activated, GTPases must bind to GTP. Since mechanisms to convert bound GDP directly into GTP are unknown, the inactive GTPases are induced to release bound GDP by the action of distinct regulatory proteins called guanine nucleotide exchange factors or GEFs. The nucleotide-free GTPase protein quickly rebinds GTP, which is in far excess in healthy cells over GDP, allowing the GTPase to enter the active conformation state and promote its effects on the cell. For many GTPases, activation of GEFs is the primary control mechanism in the stimulation of the GTPase signaling functions, although GAPs also play an important role. For heterotrimeric G proteins and many small GTP-binding proteins, GEF activity is stimulated by cell surface receptors in response to signals outside the cell (for heterotrimeric G proteins, the G protein-coupled receptors are themselves GEFs, while for receptor-activated small GTPases their GEFs are distinct from cell surface receptors).

Some GTPases also bind to accessory proteins called guanine nucleotide dissociation inhibitors or GDIs that stabilize the inactive, GDP-bound state.

The amount of active GTPase can be changed in several ways:

1. Acceleration of GDP dissociation by GEFs speeds up the accumulation of active GTPase.
2. Inhibition of GDP dissociation by guanine nucleotide dissociation inhibitors (GDIs) slows down accumulation of active GTPase.
3. Acceleration of GTP hydrolysis by GAPs reduces the amount of active GTPase.
4. Artificial GTP analogues like GTP-γ-S, β,γ-methylene-GTP, and β,γ-imino-GTP that cannot be hydrolyzed can lock the GTPase in its active state.
5. Mutations (such as those that reduce the intrinsic GTP hydrolysis rate) can lock the GTPase in the active state, and such mutations in the small GTPase Ras are particularly common in some forms of cancer.

== G domain GTPases ==
In most GTPases, the specificity for the base guanine versus other nucleotides is imparted by the base-recognition motif, which has the consensus sequence [N/T]KXD. The following classification is based on shared features; some examples have mutations in the base-recognition motif that shift their substrate specificity, most commonly to ATP.

=== TRAFAC class ===
The TRAFAC class of G domain proteins is named after the prototypical member, the translation factor G proteins. They play roles in translation, signal transduction, and cell motility.

==== Translation factor superfamily ====
Multiple classical translation factor family GTPases play important roles in initiation, elongation and termination of protein biosynthesis. Sharing a similar mode of ribosome binding due to the β-EI domain following the GTPase, the most well-known members of the family are EF-1A/EF-Tu, EF-2/EF-G, and class 2 release factors. Other members include EF-4 (LepA), BipA (TypA), SelB (bacterial selenocysteinyl-tRNA EF-Tu paralog), Tet (tetracycline resistance by ribosomal protection), and HBS1L (eukaryotic ribosome rescue protein similar to release factors).

The superfamily also includes the Bms1 family from yeast.

==== Heterotrimeric G proteins ====
Heterotrimeric G protein complexes are composed of three distinct protein subunits named alpha (α), beta (β) and gamma (γ) subunits. The alpha subunits contain the GTP binding/GTPase domain flanked by long regulatory regions, while the beta and gamma subunits form a stable dimeric complex referred to as the beta-gamma complex. When activated, a heterotrimeric G protein dissociates into activated, GTP-bound alpha subunit and separate beta-gamma subunit, each of which can perform distinct signaling roles. The α and γ subunit are modified by lipid anchors to increase their association with the inner leaflet of the plasma membrane.

Heterotrimeric G proteins act as the transducers of G protein-coupled receptors, coupling receptor activation to downstream signaling effectors and second messengers. In unstimulated cells, heterotrimeric G proteins are assembled as the GDP bound, inactive trimer (G_{α}-GDP-G_{βγ} complex). Upon receptor activation, the activated receptor intracellular domain acts as GEF to release GDP from the G protein complex and to promote binding of GTP in its place. The GTP-bound complex undergoes an activating conformation shift that dissociates it from the receptor and also breaks the complex into its component G protein alpha and beta-gamma subunit components. While these activated G protein subunits are now free to activate their effectors, the active receptor is likewise free to activate additional G proteins – this allows catalytic activation and amplification where one receptor may activate many G proteins.

G protein signaling is terminated by hydrolysis of bound GTP to bound GDP. This can occur through the intrinsic GTPase activity of the α subunit, or be accelerated by separate regulatory proteins that act as GTPase-activating proteins (GAPs), such as members of the Regulator of G protein signaling (RGS) family). The speed of the hydrolysis reaction works as an internal clock limiting the length of the signal. Once G_{α} is returned to being GDP bound, the two parts of the heterotrimer re-associate to the original, inactive state.

The heterotrimeric G proteins can be classified by sequence homology of the α unit and by their functional targets into four families: G_{s} family, G_{i} family, G_{q} family and G_{12} family. Each of these G_{α} protein families contains multiple members, such that the mammals have 16 distinct _{α}-subunit genes. The G_{β} and G_{γ} are likewise composed of many members, increasing heterotrimer structural and functional diversity. Among the target molecules of the specific G proteins are the second messenger-generating enzymes adenylyl cyclase and phospholipase C, as well as various ion channels.

==== Small GTPases ====
Small GTPases function as monomers and have a molecular weight of about 21 kilodaltons that consists primarily of the GTPase domain. They are also called small or monomeric guanine nucleotide-binding regulatory proteins, small or monomeric GTP-binding proteins, or small or monomeric G-proteins, and because they have significant homology with the first-identified such protein, named Ras, they are also referred to as Ras superfamily GTPases. Small GTPases generally serve as molecular switches and signal transducers for a wide variety of cellular signaling events, often involving membranes, vesicles or cytoskeleton. According to their primary amino acid sequences and biochemical properties, the many Ras superfamily small GTPases are further divided into five subfamilies with distinct functions: Ras, Rho ("Ras-homology"), Rab, Arf and Ran. While many small GTPases are activated by their GEFs in response to intracellular signals emanating from cell surface receptors (particularly growth factor receptors), regulatory GEFs for many other small GTPases are activated in response to intrinsic cell signals, not cell surface (external) signals.

==== Myosin-kinesin superfamily ====
This class is defined by loss of two beta-strands and additional N-terminal strands. Both namesakes of this superfamily, myosin and kinesin, have shifted to use ATP.

==== Large GTPases ====
See dynamin as a prototype for large monomeric GTPases.

=== SIMIBI class ===
Much of the SIMIBI class of GTPases is activated by dimerization. Named after the signal recognition particle (SRP), MinD, and BioD, the class is involved in protein localization, chromosome partitioning, and membrane transport. Several members of this class, including MinD and Get3, has shifted in substrate specificity to become ATPases.

==== Translocation factors ====
For a discussion of Translocation factors and the role of GTP, see signal recognition particle (SRP).

== Other GTPases ==
While tubulin and related structural proteins also bind and hydrolyze GTP as part of their function to form intracellular tubules, these proteins utilize a distinct tubulin domain that is unrelated to the G domain used by signaling GTPases.

There are also GTP-hydrolyzing proteins that use a P-loop from a superclass other than the G-domain-containing one. Examples include the NACHT proteins of its own superclass and McrB protein of the AAA+ superclass.

== See also ==
- G protein-coupled receptors
- Growth factor receptor
- Septins
