= Protein pelota homolog =

Protein-coding gene in the species Homo sapiens

PELO
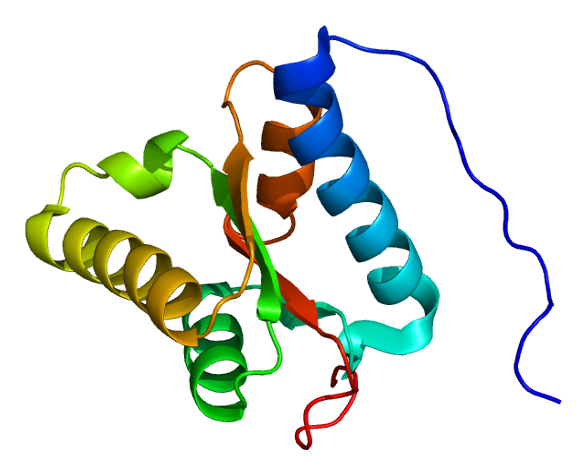
Available structures
PDB	Ortholog search: PDBe RCSB
PDB	List of PDB id codes 1X52

Identifiers
- Aliases: PELO, PRO1770, CGI-17, pelota homolog (Drosophila), pelota mRNA surveillance and ribosome rescue factor
- External IDs: OMIM: 605757; MGI: 2145154; HomoloGene: 6835; GeneCards: PELO; OMA:PELO - orthologs

Gene location (Human)
Chr.	Chromosome 5 (human)
Band	5q11.2	Start	52,787,916 bp
Band	5q11.2	End	52,804,044 bp

Gene location (Mouse)
Chr.	Chromosome 13 (mouse)
Band	13|13 D2.2	Start	115,224,891 bp
Band	13|13 D2.2	End	115,226,722 bp
RNA expression pattern
Bgee	Human / Mouse (ortholog); Top expressed in: vena cava; decidua; saphenous vein; cartilage tissue; tendon of biceps brachii; left adrenal gland; right adrenal cortex; stromal cell of endometrium; left adrenal cortex; oocyte / Top expressed in: urethra; muscle layer of urethra; bone marrow; vagina; yolk sac; epithelium of urethra; lamina propria of urethra; epithelium of female urethra; epiblast; placenta; More reference expression data
BioGPS	n/a
Gene ontology
Molecular function	endonuclease activity; nuclease activity; hydrolase activity; metal ion binding; protein binding; ribosome binding
Cellular component	nucleus; cytoplasm
Biological process	cell cycle; RNA surveillance; cell population proliferation; nuclear-transcribed mRNA catabolic process, non-stop decay; chromosome organization; nucleic acid phosphodiester bond hydrolysis; cell division; protein biosynthesis; endoderm development; stem cell population maintenance; positive regulation of BMP signaling pathway; ribosome disassembly; mesenchymal to epithelial transition; nonfunctional rRNA decay; nuclear-transcribed mRNA catabolic process, no-go decay; inner cell mass cell proliferation
Sources:Amigo / QuickGO
Orthologs
Species	Human	Mouse
Entrez	53918	105083
Ensembl	ENSG00000152684	ENSMUSG00000042275
UniProt	Q9BRX2	Q80X73
RefSeq (mRNA)	NM_015946	NM_134058
RefSeq (protein)	NP_057030	NP_598819
Location (UCSC)	Chr 5: 52.79 – 52.8 Mb	Chr 13: 115.22 – 115.23 Mb
PubMed search
- Wikidata
View/Edit Human	View/Edit Mouse

Protein pelota homolog (hPelogta) is a protein that in humans is encoded by the PELO gene.

This gene encodes a protein which contains a conserved nuclear localization signal. The encoded protein may have a role in spermatogenesis, cell cycle control, and in meiotic cell division. In yeasts, the Dom34-Hbs1 complex (with ABCE1) that it forms is responsible for reactivating ribosomes and for recovering those stuck on mRNAs. It is a paralog of the release factor eRF1.

The Drosophila homolog was first discovered in 1993. Mutants exhibit G2/M arrest in meiosis and large nebenkern form in late spermatocytes. Human, yeast (Dom34), plant, and worm homologs are reported in 1995, followed by one found in archaea.
