= ABCE1 =

Protein-coding gene in the species Homo sapiens

Identifiers
- Aliases: ABCE1, ABC38, OABP, RLI, RNASEL1, RNASELI, RNS4I, ATP binding cassette subfamily E member 1, RLI1
- External IDs: OMIM: 601213; MGI: 1195458; GeneCards: ABCE1

Gene location (Human)
Chr.	Chromosome 4 (human)
Band	4q31.21	Start	145,098,288 bp
Band	4q31.21	End	145,129,524 bp

Gene location (Mouse)
Chr.	Chromosome 8 (mouse)
Band	8|8 C1	Start	80,410,091 bp
Band	8|8 C1	End	80,438,369 bp
RNA expression pattern
Bgee	Human / Mouse (ortholog); Top expressed in: gonad; islet of Langerhans; ventricular zone; Achilles tendon; stromal cell of endometrium; testicle; ganglionic eminence; secondary oocyte; body of pancreas; rectum / Top expressed in: epiblast; cumulus cell; abdominal wall; Gonadal ridge; lacrimal gland; maxillary prominence; mandibular prominence; dermis; primitive streak; ventricular zone; More reference expression data
BioGPS	n/a
Gene ontology
Molecular function	nucleotide binding; ATPase activity; protein binding; iron ion binding; ribosomal small subunit binding; ATP binding; endoribonuclease inhibitor activity
Cellular component	cytoplasm; mitochondrial matrix; membrane; mitochondrion; eukaryotic translation initiation factor 3 complex; cytosol
Biological process	viral process; ribosomal subunit export from nucleus; translational termination; negative regulation of endoribonuclease activity; translational initiation; regulation of type I interferon-mediated signaling pathway; defense response to virus
Sources:Amigo / QuickGO
Orthologs
Databases	NCBI: entry; OMA: entry
Species	Human	Mouse
Entrez	6059	24015
Ensembl	ENSG00000164163	ENSMUSG00000058355
UniProt	P61221	P61222
RefSeq (mRNA)	NM_002940; NM_001040876	NM_015751
RefSeq (protein)	NP_001035809; NP_002931	NP_056566
Location (UCSC)	Chr 4: 145.1 – 145.13 Mb	Chr 8: 80.41 – 80.44 Mb
PubMed search
- Wikidata
View/Edit Human	View/Edit Mouse

ATP-binding cassette sub-family E member 1 (ABCE1) also known as RNase L inhibitor (RLI) is an enzyme that in humans is encoded by the ABCE1 gene.

ABCE1 is an ATPase that is a member of the ATP-binding cassette (ABC) transporters superfamily and OABP subfamily.

ABCE1 inhibits the action of ribonuclease L. Ribonuclease L normally binds to 2-5A (5'-phosphorylated 2',5'-linked oligoadenylates) and inhibits the interferon-regulated 2-5A/RNase L pathway, which is used by viruses. ABCE1 heterodimerize with ribonuclease L and prevents its interaction with 2-5A, antagonizing the anti-viral properties of ribonuclease L, and allow the virus to synthesize viral proteins. It has also been implicated to have an effect in tumor cell proliferation and antiapoptosis.

ABCE1 is an essential and highly conserved protein that is required for both eukaryotic translation initiation as well as ribosome biogenesis. The most studied homologues are Rli1p in yeast and Pixie in Drosophila.

== Structure ==
RLI is a 68 kDa cytoplasmic protein found in most eukaryota and archae. Since the crystal structure for RLI has not yet been determined, all that is known has been inferred from protein sequencing. The protein sequences between species is very well conserved, for example Pixie and yeast Rli1p are 66% identical, and Rli1p and human RLI are 67% identical.

RLI belongs to the ABCE family of ATP-binding cassette (ABC) proteins. ABC proteins typically also contain a transmembrane region, and utilize ATP to transport substrates across a membrane, however RLI is unique in that it is a soluble protein that contains ABC domains. RLI has two C-terminal ABC domains; upon binding ATP they form a characteristic "ATP-sandwich," with two ATP molecules sandwiched between the two dimerized ABC domains. Hydrolysis of ATP allows the dimer to dissociate in a fully reversible process. Incubation of the protein with a non-hydrolyzable ATP analogue or a mutation of the ABC domain causes a complete loss of protein function.

RLI also has a cysteine-rich N-terminal region that is predicted to tightly bind two [4Fe-4S] clusters. Mutation of this region, or depletion of available Fe/S clusters, renders the protein unable to function, and loss of cell viability, making RLI the only known essential cytoplasmic protein dependent on Fe/S cluster biosynthesis in the mitochondria. The function of the Fe/S clusters is unknown, although it has been suggested that they regulate the ABC domains in response to a change in the redox environment, for example in the presence of reactive oxygen species.

== Function ==
RLI and its homologues in yeast and Drosophila have two major identified functions: translation initiation and ribosome biogenesis. In addition, human RLI is a known inhibitor of RNAse L. This was the first activity identified and the source of its name (RNAse L Inhibitor).

=== Translation Initiation ===
Translation initiation is an essential process required for proper protein expression and cell viability. Rli1p has been found to co-purify with eukaryotic initiation factors, specifically eIF2, eIF5, and eIF3, as well as the 40S subunit of the ribosome. These initiation factors must associate with the ribosome in stoichiometric proportions, while Rli1p is required in catalytic amounts. The following mechanism for the process has been proposed: One ABC domain binds the 40S subunit, while the other binds an initiation factor. Binding of ATP allows for dimerization, which subsequently brings the initiation factor and ribosomal subunit in close enough contact to associate. ATP hydrolysis releases the two substrates and allows the cycle to begin again. This model is similar to one that has been proposed for DNA repair enzymes with ABC domains, in which each domain binds either side of a broken piece of DNA, with hydrolysis allowing the pieces to be brought together and subsequently repaired.

=== Ribosome recycling ===
Recycling is essential for ribosomes to become usable again after translating an mRNA or stalling. In both eukaryotes and archaea, ABCE1 is responsible for splitting a ribosome that has been bound to Pelota or its paralog eRF1. The exact movements leading to the split is not well understood.

=== Ribosome biogenesis ===
RLI and its homologues are also thought to play a role in ribosome biogenesis, nuclear export, or both. They have been found in the nucleus associated with the 40S and 60S subunits, as well as Hcr1p, a protein required for rRNA processing. It has been shown that the Fe/S clusters are necessary for ribosome biogenesis and/or nuclear export, although the exact mechanism is unknown.

=== RNAse inhibitor ===
Human RLI was first identified because of its ability to inhibit RNAse L, which plays a crucial role in antiviral activity in mammals. This cannot account for the conservation of the protein in all other organisms, since only mammals have the RNAse L system. It has been suggested that RLI in lower eukaryotes functions by inhibiting RNAses involved in ribosomal biosynthesis, thereby regulating the process.

== Role in mitochondria ==
The mitochondria's energetic and metabolic functions have been established to be non-essential for yeast cell viability. The only function that has been implicated in being necessary for survival is the biosynthesis of Fe/S clusters. RLI is the only known essential cytoplasmic Fe/S protein that is absolutely dependent on the mitochondrial Fe/S synthesis and export system for proper maturation. Rli1p is therefore a novel link between the mitochondria and ribosome function and biosynthesis, and therefore the viability of the cell.
