= RLI =

RLI may refer to:

== Organizations ==
- RLI Corp., an American property and casualty insurance company
- Rand Light Infantry, South Africa
- Renaissance Learning, an educational assessment and learning analytics company
- Rhodesian Light Infantry, military unit inside the Rhodesian army
- Royal Lancaster Infirmary, a hospital in Lancaster, England
- Rugby League Ireland

== Other uses ==
- RLI (gene), also known as ABCE1, a protein required for translation initiation in eukaryotes
- RLi, an abbreviation for an organolithium reagent
- Red List Index, an indicator of global biodiversity
