= TRAPPC4 =

Protein-coding gene in the species Homo sapiens

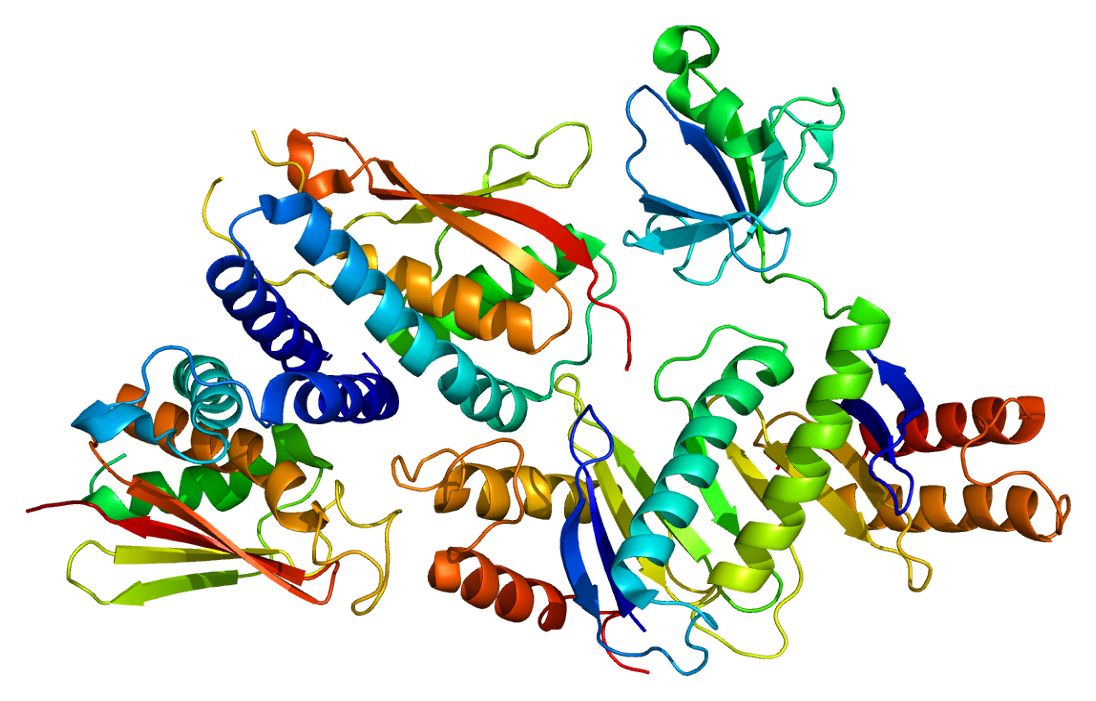

Identifiers
- Aliases: TRAPPC4, HSPC172, PTD009, SBDN, SYNBINDIN, TRS23, CGI-104, trafficking protein particle complex 4, NEDESBA, trafficking protein particle complex subunit 4
- External IDs: OMIM: 610971; MGI: 1926211; GeneCards: TRAPPC4
Available structures
| PDB | Ortholog search: PDBe RCSB |
| PDB | List of PDB id codes 2J3T, 2JSN, 2ZMV |

Gene location (Human)
| Chr. | Chromosome 11 (human) |
| Band | 11q23.3 | Start | 119,018,763 bp |
| Band | 11q23.3 | End | 119,025,454 bp |

Gene location (Mouse)
| Chr. | Chromosome 9 (mouse) |
| Band | 9|9 A5.2 | Start | 44,314,995 bp |
| Band | 9|9 A5.2 | End | 44,318,897 bp |
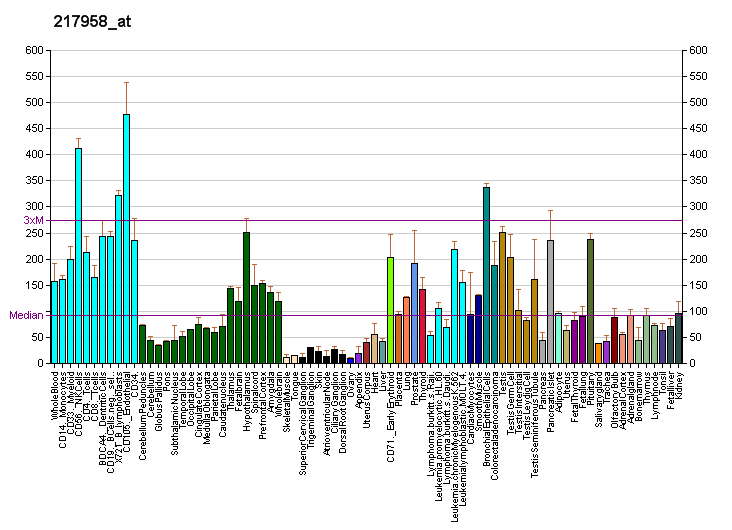

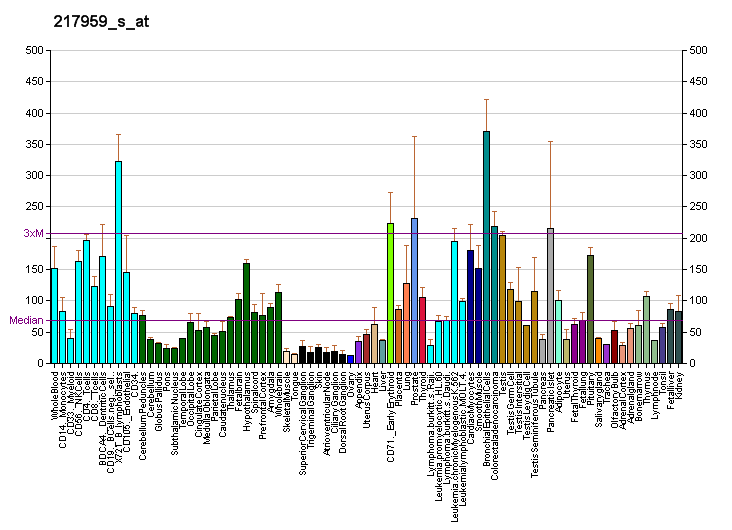
RNA expression pattern
| Bgee | Human / Mouse (ortholog); Top expressed in: islet of Langerhans; anterior pituitary; right testis; left testis; stromal cell of endometrium; ganglionic eminence; right adrenal gland; left adrenal gland; left adrenal cortex; human kidney / Top expressed in: medial ganglionic eminence; right kidney; ventricular zone; neural tube; morula; otic placode; granulocyte; facial motor nucleus; dentate gyrus of hippocampal formation granule cell; embryo; More reference expression data |
| BioGPS | More reference expression data |
Gene ontology
| Molecular function | protein binding |
| Cellular component | cytosol; Golgi apparatus; synaptic vesicle; synapse; dendrite; endoplasmic reticulum; Golgi stack; Golgi membrane; TRAPP complex |
| Biological process | dendrite development; COPII vesicle coating; vesicle-mediated transport; endoplasmic reticulum to Golgi vesicle-mediated transport |
Sources:Amigo / QuickGO
Orthologs
| Databases | NCBI: entry; OMA: entry |
| Species | Human | Mouse |
| Entrez | 51399 | 60409 |
| Ensembl | ENSG00000280495; ENSG00000196655 | ENSMUSG00000032112 |
| UniProt | Q9Y296 | Q9ES56 |
| RefSeq (mRNA) | NM_016146; NM_001318486; NM_001318488; NM_001318489; NM_001318490 NM_001318492; NM_001318494 | NM_021789 |
| RefSeq (protein) | NP_001305415; NP_001305417; NP_001305418; NP_001305419; NP_001305421 NP_001305423; NP_057230 | NP_068561 |
| Location (UCSC) | Chr 11: 119.02 – 119.03 Mb | Chr 9: 44.31 – 44.32 Mb |
| PubMed search |
- Wikidata
| View/Edit Human | View/Edit Mouse |

Trafficking protein particle complex subunit 4 is a protein that in humans is encoded by the TRAPPC4 gene. It is part of TRAPP complex.
