= Carl Benda =

German microbiologist (1857–1932)

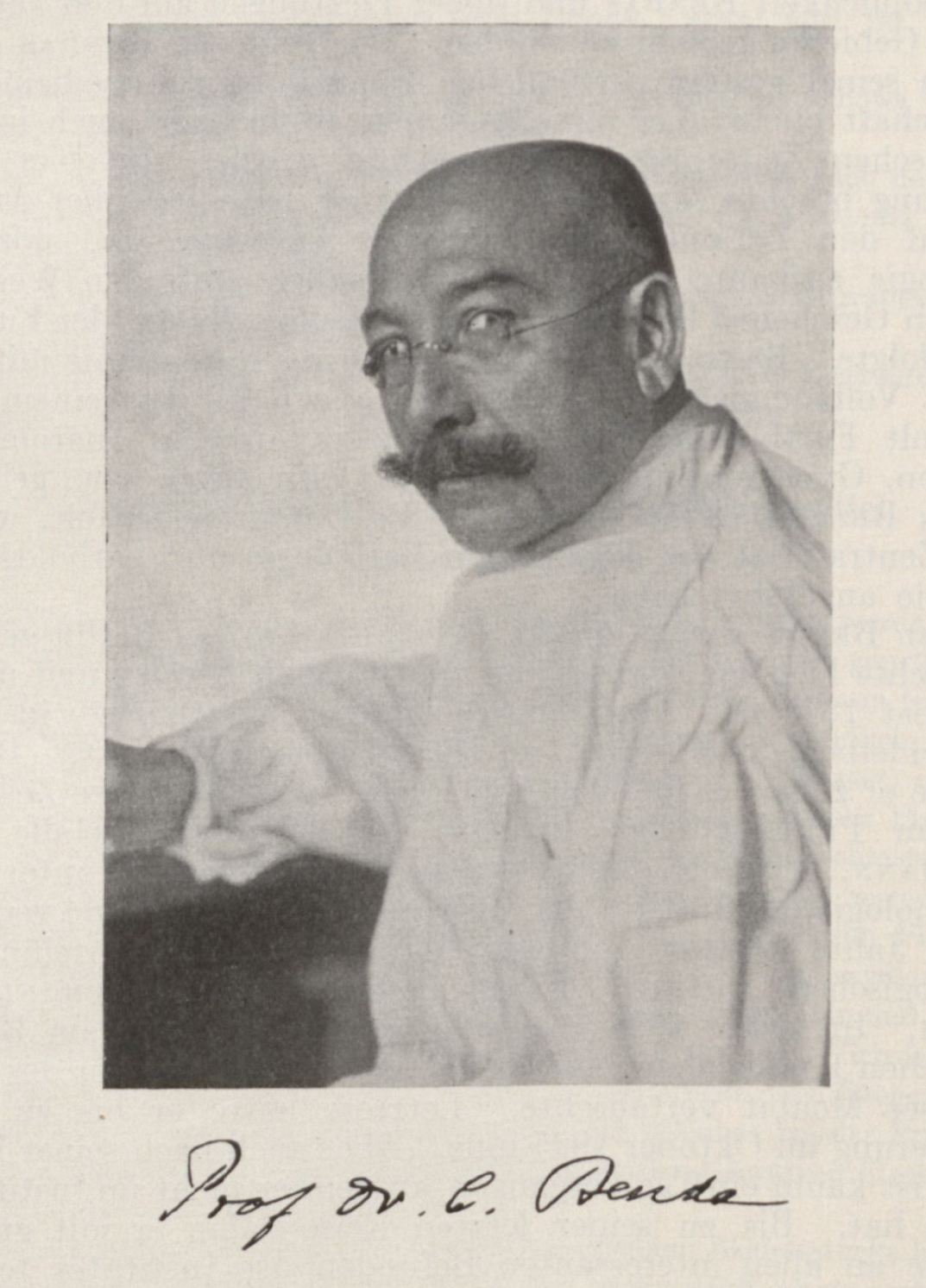

Carl Benda (30 December 1857 Berlin – 24 May 1932 Turin) was one of the first microbiologists to use a microscope in studying the internal structure of cells. In an 1898 experiment using crystal violet as a specific stain, Benda first became aware of the existence of hundreds of these tiny bodies in the cytoplasm of eukaryotic cells and assumed that they reinforced the cell structure. Because of their tendency to form long chains, he coined the name mitochondria ("thread granules"). These bodies had first been noted in 1857 by the physiologist and pioneer of the light microscope, Albert von Kölliker, and were later termed "bioblasts" by Richard Altmann in 1886.

Benda studied medicine in Berlin, Heidelberg, Vienna and Paris, and received his doctorate in medicine in 1881. From there he became an assistant in the pathology institute in Halle (Saale) and Göttingen and the physiology institute in Berlin. In 1888 he earned his habilitation in anatomy in Berlin. From 1894 to 1907 he was prosector at the Stadt-Krankenhaus am Urban, and was titular professor from 1899. From 1908 to 1925 at the Institute of Pathology Krankenhaus Moabit. In 1921 he became emeritus professor until 1925 when he retired. His son was the doctor Clemens Ernst Benda (1898-1975).
