= Mitoplast =

Mitochondrion without outer membrane

A mitoplast is a mitochondrion that has been stripped of its outer membrane leaving the inner membrane and matrix intact.

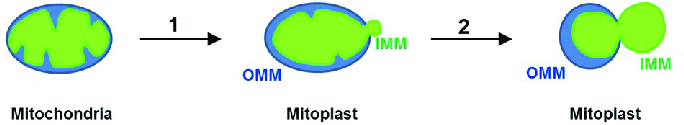
Preparation of mitoplasts (OMM= outer mitochondrial membrane, IMM= inner mitochondrial membrane).

== How mitoplasts are most commonly created ==
To begin the process, mitochondria must first be separated from cultured cells. This is typically a two step process using homogenization to release the intercellular contents and differential centrifugation to separate the mitochondria from other organelles. Once the mitochondria are isolated, mitoplasts can then be formed. Mitoplasts are most commonly formed using an apparatus called a French Press. As the mitochondria pass through the narrow valve of the French press, they experience extremely high pressures around 2,000 psi that rupture the outer mitochondrial membrane. The mitoplasts are then sedimented and kept in a specific storage buffer until use. When the mitoplasts are needed, they are simply placed in a potassium chloride (KCl) incubation buffer that causes the mitochondrial matrix to swell. As a result of the swelling, the inner membrane will protrude from the outer membrane to form one of two distinct shapes. Mitoplasts generated with the French press method typically produce a bilobed vesicle and are shaped similar to a figure 8. These figure 8-shaped mitoplasts are preferred because they are considered to be the healthiest. However, O-shaped mitoplasts can also form, but this type is not preferred for experimental use since they are often compromised.

== History of mitoplast creation ==
The scientific understanding of mitochondria has grown tremendously since the 1930s due to development of the electron microscope. By the early 1950s, scientists were able establish to that mitochondria had two distinct membranes. However, since mitochondrial research was primarily focused on the electron transport chain and oxidative phosphorylation, it was not until over a decade later that methods were developed to separate the two mitochondrial membranes from each other.

During the mid-to-late 1960s, several independent laboratories claimed they had successfully separated the outer mitochondrial membrane and inner mitochondrial membrane. In March 1967, a team of researchers from the Nutritional Physiology Laboratory in France published an article that discussed their studies of the enzymatic activities of the outer mitochondrial membrane. Since their studies required the isolation of the outer mitochondrial membrane, a method based on the successive actions of digitonin and sonication for separating the two mitochondrial membranes was also described. To complete their isolation procedure, the crude fraction of the outer membrane was purified using differential centrifugation. About a year later in July 1968, a research team from the Department of Physiological Chemistry at Johns Hopkins School of Medicine published an article describing their method for separation of the mitochondrial membranes in rat livers also using digitonin and differential centrifugation. In addition to separating the outer and inner membranes, they were able to further separate the inner membrane and matrix through treatment with a nonionic detergent called Lubrol. This process then allowed for calculation of the relative protein content within each mitochondrial component. The rationale amongst both articles for using low concentrations of digitonin to detach the outer mitochondrial membrane was that the outer membrane was rich in cholesterol which would cause it to bind to the digitonin. After further study, the research team from Johns Hopkins was able to refine their method of mitoplast preparation to produce mitochondria without an outer membrane and with a relatively intact inner membrane and matrix.

Another procedure for mitoplast preparation, described by two additional research groups, took advantage of the selective shrinking of the inner membrane after liver mitochondria were exposed to a swelling-contraction cycle. During this procedure, the swollen outer membrane ruptured either spontaneously or ideally after being subjected to gentle sonication. Following the rupture of the outer membrane, the inner membrane components could be separated from the outer membrane by differential centrifugation. This procedure is effective due to the distinct differences between the outer and inner mitochondrial membranes, specifically those regarding osmotic behavior and permeability. According to extensive research, the inner membrane is able to respond to changes in osmotic pressure by unfolding and refolding. However, the outer membrane has shown no reversible responses to changes in osmotic pressure. Therefore, the distention and rupture of the outer membrane is a passive process caused by unfolding of the inner membrane due to change in osmotic pressure.

Although these methods of separation were proven to be fairly efficient at the time, their mechanical nature became outdated as new technology, such as the French Press, was developed to make mitoplast creation quicker and easier for researchers.

== Mitoplast research ==
The ability for researchers to separate the two mitochondrial membranes to form a mitoplast has created many new possibilities for mitochondrion studies. As mentioned previously, researchers have now been able to calculate the relative protein content within each component of a mitochondrion. In addition, mitoplasts enabled the determination of the intramitochondrial distribution of enzymes, which had previously been impossible since the inner membrane was encased by the outer membrane. Therefore, not long after mitoplasts could be readily created, various data became available regarding almost all enzymes that had been suspected to be present in mitochondria.

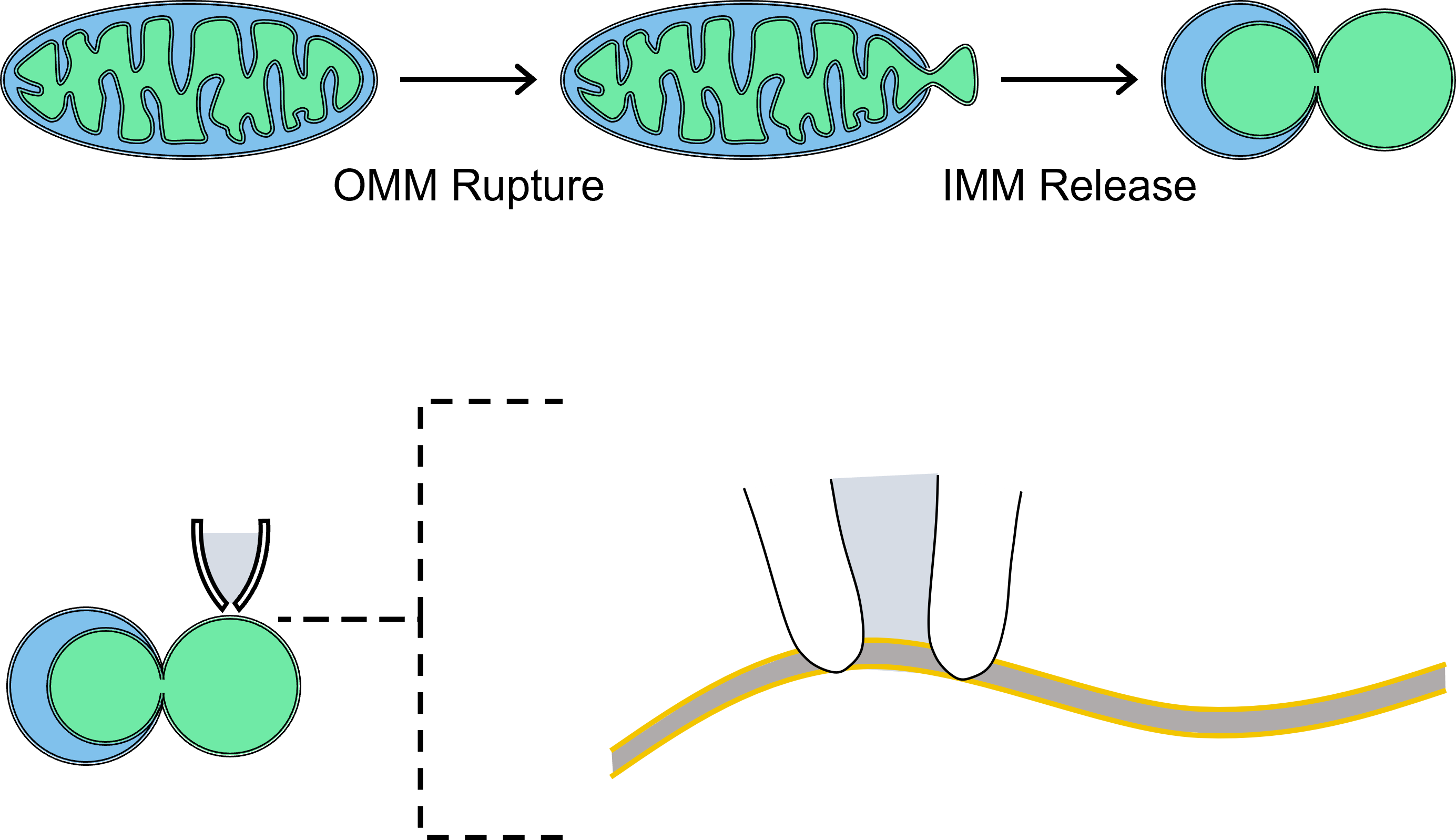
Diagram of mitoplast preparation for electrophysiological analysis. Remnants of the outer mitochondrial membrane remain. IMM = inner mitochondrial membrane (green), OMM = outer mitochondrial membrane (blue)

Mitoplasts are also useful for electrophysiological analysis of mitochondrial function since mitochondria can retain normal function even after their outer membrane has been removed. Specifically, patch-clamp electrophysiology has emerged as a novel method for studying functionality of the inner membrane. This method facilitates sensitive current measurement across the membrane, useful for studying the electron transport chain and proton leak (i.e., the uncoupling of proton movement down its electrochemical gradient and ATP synthesis via ATP synthase).
