= OXA1L =

Protein-coding gene in the species Homo sapiens

Identifiers
- Aliases: OXA1L, OXA1, mitochondrial inner membrane protein, OXA1L mitochondrial inner membrane protein
- External IDs: OMIM: 601066; MGI: 1916339; GeneCards: OXA1L

Gene location (Human)
Chr.	Chromosome 14 (human)
Band	14q11.2	Start	22,766,522 bp
Band	14q11.2	End	22,773,042 bp

Gene location (Mouse)
Chr.	Chromosome 14 (mouse)
Band	14|14 C2	Start	54,598,291 bp
Band	14|14 C2	End	54,607,130 bp
RNA expression pattern
Bgee	Human / Mouse (ortholog); Top expressed in: muscle of thigh; body of pancreas; thoracic diaphragm; gastrocnemius muscle; apex of heart; triceps brachii muscle; left ventricle; body of stomach; right adrenal cortex; rectum / Top expressed in: muscle of thigh; yolk sac; genital tubercle; ventricular zone; epiblast; tail of embryo; lip; right kidney; dentate gyrus of hippocampal formation granule cell; gastrula; More reference expression data
BioGPS	n/a
Gene ontology
Molecular function	mitochondrial ribosome binding; protein binding; protein homodimerization activity; membrane insertase activity
Cellular component	integral component of membrane; mitochondrial inner membrane; integral component of mitochondrial membrane; mitochondrial membranes; mitochondrion; membrane; mitochondrial respirasome; protein-containing complex; mitochondrial matrix; integral component of mitochondrial inner membrane
Biological process	negative regulation of ATP-dependent activity; aerobic dissimilation; mitochondrial proton-transporting ATP synthase complex assembly; protein tetramerization; negative regulation of oxidoreductase activity; mitochondrial respiratory chain complex I assembly; protein-containing complex assembly; protein transport; mitochondrial translational elongation; mitochondrial translational termination; protein insertion into mitochondrial inner membrane from matrix; mitochondrial cytochrome c oxidase assembly; protein insertion into membrane
Sources:Amigo / QuickGO
Orthologs
Databases	NCBI: entry; OMA: entry
Species	Human	Mouse
Entrez	5018	69089
Ensembl	ENSG00000155463	ENSMUSG00000000959
UniProt	Q15070	Q8BGA9
RefSeq (mRNA)	NM_005015	NM_026936
RefSeq (protein)	NP_005006	NP_081212
Location (UCSC)	Chr 14: 22.77 – 22.77 Mb	Chr 14: 54.6 – 54.61 Mb
PubMed search
- Wikidata
View/Edit Human	View/Edit Mouse

Mitochondrial inner membrane protein OXA1L is a protein that in humans is encoded by the OXA1L gene located on 14q11.2. The C-terminus of this protein interacts with mitochondrial ribosomes and helps insert both mitochondrial and nuclear produced proteins into the inner membrane of the mitochondria.
