= TRAPP complex =

The TRAPP (TRAnsport Protein Particle) complex is a protein complex involved in particle transport between organelles.

== Protein folding and the Endoplasmic Reticulum (ER) ==
Proteins that are destined for the plasma membrane or export to the extracellular environment in eukaryotic cells are translated on ribosomes that sit on the rough endoplasmic reticulum (RER). Most proteins are co-translationally transported into the ER (i.e., while the ribosome is translating the mRNA code into a polypeptide, the polypeptide is simultaneously inserted via the translocon pore into the ER). The ER provides an environment that helps nascent polypeptides fold into and become functional or partially functional proteins. The ER provides an oxidizing environment (for formation of disulfide bonds) and the necessary chaperones (folding assisting agents that are not part of the final protein). Numerous exported proteins form disulfide bonds—covalent bonds that stabilize the protein structure in harsh extracellular environments. A classic example are the disulfide-linked heavy and light chain polypeptides of antibodies secreted by B-cells of the immune system.

Another key event that takes place in the ER is N-linked glycosylation. In this process, polypeptides that have a unique stretch of 3 amino acids (asparagine - X - serine/threonine, where X represents any amino acid except proline) are modified with a complex sugar moiety on the amide group of asparagine. Other types of glycosylations include S-linked (via cysteine residues), C-linked (via tryptophan) and O-linked (via serine or threonine). By far, N-linked glycosylation is the most abundant post-translational modification found in eukaryotic cells.

== Protein export from the ER and the COP II coat ==
Once proteins have folded and are ready to be transported out of the ER it is thought that they assemble at specific site within the ER called "ER exit sites". These sites can be transient but are most likely situated in the ER where the ER is close to the next transport compartment, the vesicular-tubular cluster (VTC) (also referred to as the ER-Golgi Intermediate Compartment (ERGIC)). The details of how proteins are concentrated or localized to the exit site is unclear but the actual process of budding a vesicle containing these proteins starts with a protein called Sec12. This protein recruits a small GTPase called Sar1. Sar1 can be thought of as a switch which is active when bound to GTP and inactive when it hydrolyses the GTP to GDP. This in turn leads to the recruitment of a protein complex, the Sec23/Sec24 and the Sec13/Sec31 complex (also known as the COPII coat). The protein complexes form a mesh at the ER exit site and through mechanical curvature form a little "blob" that pinches off from the ER with proteins inside. The mesh disassembles off the budded vesicle when Sar1 hydrolyses the GTP to GDP. This activity of Sar1 is enhanced by Sec23/24.

== Vesicle transport and tethering ==
Once the vesicles pinch off from the ER they are transported passively (by diffusion) or actively (by intracellular motors that run on cytoskeletal tracks). The mode of transport seems to be influenced by distance. Short distances may tend towards passive transport, whereas longer distances tend towards active transport. Once these vesicles reach their destination, they need to be first physically linked with their acceptor compartment (else they may float away). This process is facilitated by "tethers". Tethers come in two "flavors": long protein(s) with domains called "coiled-coil," or complexes of many subunits which are for the most part globular. The tether that functions to tether ER derived vesicles to the VTC (or Golgi apparatus in case of lower eukaryotes), the next compartment in the transport pathway, is the Transport Protein Particle (TRAPP).

== TRAPP as a tether ==
TRAPP also comes in two "flavors", TRAPP I & II. TRAPP I is a multisubunit complex that consists of seven subunits (Bet5, Bet3, Trs20, Trs23, Trs31, Trs33, Trs85). TRAPPII has three additional subunits (Trs65, Trs120 and Trs130) and functions as a tether at latter stages of the transport pathway. TRAPP I binds these ER derived vesicles and brings the vesicle closer to the acceptor membrane. This close juxtapositioning of the two membranes allows the interaction between SNARE's (soluble NSF (N-ethylmaleimide sensitive Factor) attachment protein receptor) on both compartments. The interacting SNARE's then pull the membranes close and allow for fusion.

A recent report has shown that the initial interaction between TRAPP and the ER derived vesicle is mediated via the interaction between the TRAPP subunit Bet3 and the COPII coat subunit, Sec23. The conventional view of tethering/fusion assumed that the vesicle coat is shed prior to tethering and fusion but this report argues for a model where the initial tethering step takes place on a coated or partially coated vesicle. The TRAPPI complex minus the subunit Trs85 was recently crystallized as two subcomplexes that were then modelled on EM etch data to reveal a possible crystal structure for the entire complex. A putative ypt/rab binding site was indicated on the crystal structure involving the subunits Trs23 and Bet5. Incidentally, all 5 essential small subunits (Trs31, Trs20, Bet3, Bet5 and Trs23) are required to reconstitute efficient exchange activity on ypt1 in vitro. Therefore, it remains to be seen whether the interface between ypt1 and TRAPPI is only confined to Trs23 and Bet5 and how the other subunit influence exchange activity.

== Clinical significance ==
Mutations in the TRAPP system have been associated with neurological deficits.
