= Submitochondrial particle =

Simplified cross-section of a mitochondrion and a submitochondrial particle, showing the particle's inverted membrane orientation. Whereas whole submitochondrial particles can perform oxidative phosphorylation yielding ATP, destabilized particles lacking F_{1} particles consume oxygen and oxidize NADH without synthesizing ATP, and free F_{1} particles catalyze the hydrolysis of ATP into ADP.

A submitochondrial particle (SMP) is an artificial vesicle made from the inner mitochondrial membrane. They can be formed by subjecting isolated mitochondria to sonication, freezing and thawing, high pressure, or osmotic shock. SMPs can be used to study the electron transport chain in a cell-free context.

The process of SMP formation forces the inner mitochondrial membrane inside out, meaning that the matrix-facing leaflet becomes the outer surface of the SMP, and the intermembrane space-facing leaflet faces the lumen of the SMP. As a consequence, the F_{1} particles which normally face the matrix are exposed. Chaotropic agents can destabilize F_{1} particles and cause them to dissociate from the membrane, thereby uncoupling the final step of oxidative phosphorylation from the rest of the electron transport chain.
