= Nebenkern =

Covering of axoneme as a mitochondrial spiral

The nebenkern is a mitochondrial formation in the sperm of some insects such as Drosophila. After the completion of meiosis, spermatid mitochondria wrap around each other to form a spherical aggregate, adjacent to the nucleus. The nebenkern proceeds to elongate into a double-stranded helical structure. During flagellum elongation the nebenkern unfolds and the two derivatives (major and minor mitochondrial derivatives) elongate down the bundle of microtubules that constitute the axoneme core of the flagellum.
