= Richard Altmann =

German histologist and pathologist of the 19th century

- Born: 12 March 1852
- Died: 8 December 1900 (aged 48)
- Occupations: Pathologist, histologist

Richard Altmann (12 March 1852 – 8 December 1900) was a German pathologist and histologist from Deutsch Eylau in the Province of Prussia.

Altmann studied medicine in Greifswald, Königsberg, Marburg, and Giessen, obtaining a doctorate at the University of Giessen in 1877. He then worked as a prosector at Leipzig, and in 1887 became an anatomy professor (extraordinary). He died in Hubertusburg in 1900 from a nervous disorder.

He improved fixation methods, for instance, his solution of potassium dichromate and osmium tetroxide. Using that along with a new staining technique of applying acid-fuchsin contrasted by picric acid amid delicate heating, he observed filaments in the nearly all cell types, developed from granules. He named the granules "bioblasts", and explained them as the elementary living units, having metabolic and genetic autonomy, in his 1890 book "Die Elementarorganismen" ("The Elementary Organism"). His explanation drew much skepticism and harsh criticism. Altmann's granules are now believed to be mitochondria.

He is credited with coining the term "nucleic acid" in 1889, replacing Friedrich Miescher's term "nuclein" when it was demonstrated that nuclein was acidic.
