= Eukaryotic translation termination factor 1 =

Protein-coding gene in the species Homo sapiens

ETF1
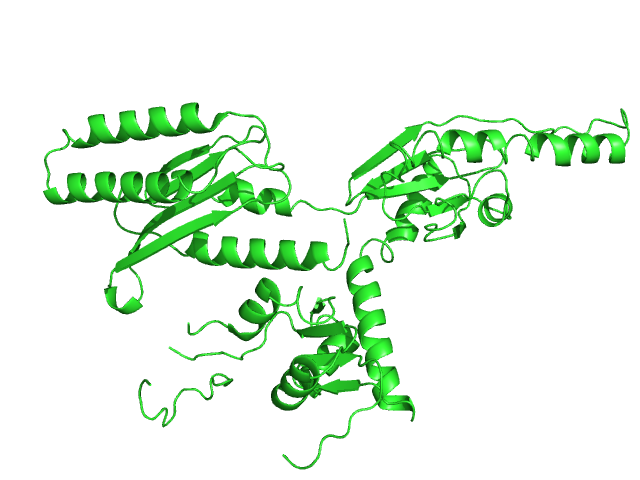

Identifiers
- Aliases: ETF1, D5S1995, ERF, ERF1, RF1, SUP45L1, TB3-1, eukaryotic translation termination factor 1
- External IDs: OMIM: 600285; MGI: 2385071; GeneCards: ETF1
Available structures
PDB	Ortholog search: PDBe RCSB
PDB	List of PDB id codes 1DT9, 2HST, 2KTU, 2KTV, 2LGT, 2LLX, 3E1Y, 3J5Y, 4D5N, 4D61, 2MQ6, 2MQ9, 3JAG, 3JAH, 3JAI, 5A8L

Gene location (Human)
Chr.	Chromosome 5 (human)
Band	5q31.2	Start	138,506,095 bp
Band	5q31.2	End	138,543,236 bp

Gene location (Mouse)
Chr.	Chromosome 18 (mouse)
Band	18|18 B1	Start	35,035,838 bp
Band	18|18 B1	End	35,065,060 bp
RNA expression pattern
Bgee	Human / Mouse (ortholog); Top expressed in: islet of Langerhans; skin of thigh; mucosa of sigmoid colon; skin of abdomen; cartilage tissue; lower lobe of lung; smooth muscle tissue; gastrocnemius muscle; placenta; bone marrow / Top expressed in: epiblast; primitive streak; somite; lens; mandibular prominence; tail of embryo; maxillary prominence; spermatid; endothelial cell of lymphatic vessel; lactiferous gland; More reference expression data
BioGPS	n/a
Gene ontology
Molecular function	ribosome binding; translation termination factor activity; protein binding; RNA binding; sequence-specific mRNA binding; translation release factor activity; translation release factor activity, codon specific
Cellular component	cytoplasm; cytosol; nucleus; translation release factor complex
Biological process	translational termination; nuclear-transcribed mRNA catabolic process, nonsense-mediated decay; regulation of translational termination; protein methylation; protein biosynthesis; cytoplasmic translational termination
Sources:Amigo / QuickGO
Orthologs
Databases	NCBI: entry; OMA: entry
Species	Human	Mouse
Entrez	2107	225363
Ensembl	ENSG00000120705	ENSMUSG00000024360
UniProt	P62495	Q8BWY3
RefSeq (mRNA)	NM_001256302; NM_001282185; NM_001291974; NM_001291975; NM_004730 NM_001364160	NM_144866
RefSeq (protein)	NP_001243231; NP_001269114; NP_001278903; NP_001278904; NP_004721 NP_001351089	NP_659115
Location (UCSC)	Chr 5: 138.51 – 138.54 Mb	Chr 18: 35.04 – 35.07 Mb
PubMed search
- Wikidata
View/Edit Human	View/Edit Mouse

Eukaryotic translation termination factor 1 (eRF1), also referred to as TB3-1 or SUP45L1, is a protein that is encoded by the ERF1 gene. In Eukaryotes, eRF1 is an essential protein involved in stop codon recognition in translation, termination of translation, and nonsense mediated mRNA decay via the SURF complex.

== Importance ==
All cells need to make proteins through the processes of transcription and translation. eRF1 is essential for the survival and maintenance of cells due to its involvement in the termination of translation. Any mutation to the binding and catalytic sites of eRF1 would cause an improper termination of translation, which is lethal to the cell. Additionally, eRF1 protects the cell from producing detrimental proteins from nonsense mutations.

== Structure ==
=== Primary ===
The eRF1 is composed of a polypeptide chain of amino acids in the shape of the letter Y. The protein is composed of 3 major domains: a stem and 2 branches. Each domain has a specific purpose and distinct folding pattern which allows the protein to function properly. While each domain is unique, they all contain the basic structure of an α-β sandwich class, which is essentially a β sheet core surrounded by α helices. Domain 1, sometimes referred to as the N domain, is constructed from a β-sheet core with 4 strands surrounded by 2 α-helices (α2 and α3). The subunits α2 and α3 coil and bind to form a hairpin structure that contains the NIKS motif, YxxCxxxF motif, and the GTS loop. These sites are hypothesized to be the primary appendage in stop codon recognition. Additionally the N-terminus is located in Domain 1, which interacts with Domain 3 in-order to maintain protein stability. Domain 3, sometimes referred to as the C domain, contains the C-terminus of the polypeptide. Additionally, the structure and function of Domain 3, referred to as the M domain, is the least known as optical limitations hinder further research. Domain 2 consists of an α-β sandwich, with one of the outer strands of the sandwich containing no secondary structure. The primary amino acid section allows the GGQ site to form.

The folded structure of eRF1 is essentially mimicking the structure of a tRNA molecule. This ensures that the eRF1 machinery fits into the aminoacyl site of the ribosome. The eRF1 also has the ability to recognize codons, which is one of the important processes carried out by tRNA molecules. Since both tRNA and eRF1 both have the ability to bind with the mRNA and the peptidyl transferase center, they have similar dimensions with eRF1 having a width of 71 Å to the 70 Å of phenylalanine tRNA. Both molecules interact with GTPases: eEF-1α (EF-Tu in prokaryotes) with tRNA and eRF3 with eRF1.

The motif in physiological biology between structure and functional relatedness is very much present between eRF1 and tRNA molecules. The GGQ site in the eRF1 is the equivalent to the aminoacyl group attached to the tRNA. Both structures contribute to recognition and binding of the peptidy-transferase site in the ribosome. Both structures orientate the highly specialized site distant from the rest of the molecule to ensure an isolated interaction. Furthermore Domain 2 of eRF1 is structurally similar to the aminoacyl stem of the tRNA. The T stem of the tRNA and Domain 3 of eRF1 both serve the purpose of interacting with a GTPase proteins.

=== GGQ motif ===
The GGQ motif is a conserved amino acid sequence in release factors through all domains of life. The GGQ site consists of two glycine amino acids followed by a glutamine. In eRF1, the GGQ site is on residues 183-185 of the polypeptide, which is located on Domain 2. The distant orientation of the GGQ site is stabilized by the hydrophobic effects of neighboring amino acid residues such as leucine 176, proline 177, phenylalanine 190, and leucine 193. The gln185 residue of the GGC motif is thought to be the main catalytic site for the hydrolysis of the peptidyl-tRNA ester bond in the peptidyl transferase of the ribosome. The GGQ site is not associated with any functions of stop codon recognition, ribosomal docking, or eRF3 binding.

=== NIKS motif ===
The NIKS motif is a highly conserved amino acid sequence located on the N-Terminus in Domain 1 (amino acid residues 61-64). The NIKS motif contains the amino acids Asparagine (N), Isoleucine (I), Lysine (K), and Serine (S). The main function of the NIKS motif is to recognize the first nucleotide in the stop codon, which is always uracil. Additionally, mutations in this region has been associated with decrease ribosomal binding and catalytic activity.

=== YxxCxxxF motif and GTS loop ===
The YxxCxxxF motif and GTS loop are two amino acid sites that are located in Domain 1 of eRF1. The YxxCxxxF motif is found in the amino acid residues 121-131, whereas the GTS loop is found in amnio acid residues 31-33. The YxxCxxxF is composed of three invariant amino acid residues: Tyrosine (Y), Cysteine (C), and Phenylalanine (F). These sites are structurally separated in the folded eRF1 protein, however their main functions are very similar. They are responsible for purine recognition in position 2 and 3 of the stop codon.

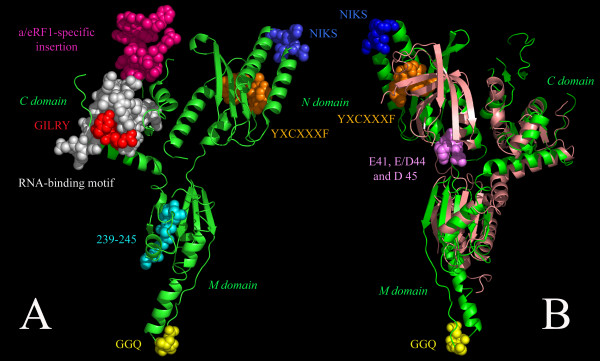
The image displays the structure of eRF1 alone with key annotations of significant sites.

=== eRF3 binding ===
The binding of eRF3 and GTP to eRF1 to form a complex is essential for termination of translation. The interaction between the C domains of both eRF1 and eRF3 is the major force holding the complex together. However, it was later discovered that the M domain also contributes to the stability of the complex. The positioning of eRF3 near the GGQ motif, which is in the C domain, allows greater catalytic effects of eRF1 hydrolyzing the peptidyl-tRNA.

=== Homologues ===
Each domain of life (Eubacteria, Archaea, and Eukaryotes) have different release factors associated with the termination of translation. Eubacteria have multiple release factor to recognize stop codons whereas Eukaryotes (eRF1) and Archaea (aRF1) have only one protein to recognize all three stop codons. The structural and functional differences between Eubacteria release factors and Archean/Eukaryotic are believed to have evolved separately with a divergence point early on. The functional similarities between eRF1 and aRF1 has led to theories of a common ancestor where both proteins evolved from. However, very little has been studied about Archean release factors.

In prokaryotes, the release factors are characterized in 2 classes. Class 1 release factors recognize stop codon, and class 2 release factors stimulate hydrolysis by GTPase activity. However, prokaryotes don't have a single protein to recognize all the stop codons. The stop codon UAG is decoded by Release Factor 1 (RF1) and UGA is decoded by Release Factor 2. The final stop codon UAA is decoded by both RF1 and RF2. In Eukaryotes, eRF1 recognizes all three stop codons.

Although there is a distinct difference between prokaryotic codon recognition and Archean/Eukaryotic codon recognition, the functionality of the catalytic site is conserved throughout all domains. Each domain has the critical GGQ site to promote peptide hydrolysis.

== Stop codon recognition ==
The termination of translation is determined by the presence of a release factor recognizing a stop codon, which then catalyzes the release of the newly synthesized protein. There are three stop codon found within all domains of life: UGA, UAG, and UAA. Each stop codon starts with a uracil nucleotide followed by two purines (adenosine and guanine), which is essential for the molecular basis of stop codon recognition. The eRF1 protein is capable of recognizing all three stop codons, which means it must have a way to differentiate codons very efficiently. The three sites used for stop codon recognition are the YxxCxxxF, GTS loop and NIKS site.

The main object of the highly specialized sites is to create extensive networks of hydrogen bonding crosslinking with the mRNA stop codon. The process is separated into two sections: recognizing the first nucleotide (uracil) and recognizing the second and third position nucleotides.

=== First nucleotide recognition ===
The NIKS site is responsible for binding with the first nucleotide of the stop codon: uracil. This is achieved by the Asn61 and Lys63 residues of NIKS forming hydrogen bonds with the carbonyl group of the uracil. A secondary hydrogen bond is formed between the Asn61 residue with a different carbonyl found on uracil. Additionally it has been hypothesized that the lys63 residue interacts with the backbone of the mRNA which contributes to stability and proper alignment of eRF1. The specificity of the mechanism for uracil means that any other nucleotide (guanine, adenosine, thymine, cytosine) will produce a structure that doesn't have extensive hydrogen bonding to stabilize the docking of eRF1.

=== Second and third nucleotide recognition ===
The second and third position nucleotides are recognized by YxxCxxxF and GTS sites. This process is very important because this gives eRF1 the ability to discriminate the stop codon from a uracil starting sense codons that codes for an amino acid. For example the cysteine amino acid is coded by the codon UGU. The first step in discriminating stop from sense codons is to distinguish purines from pyrimidines, since all stop codons have purine nucleotides in the +2 and +3 position. Two highly conserved amino acid residues Glu55 and Tyr125 (located in the YxxCxxxF motif) work in tandem to hydrogen bond with the N6 nitrogen atom on the adenosine/guanine nucleotide. This interaction excludes the possibility of pyrimidines in the +2 and +3 position.

Further discrimination of the purines in the +2 and +3 position is need since UGG is a sense codon for tryptophan. In the case of UGG, the Glu55 residue is repelled from the strong negative charge from the two guanine nucleotides. Since no extensive hydrogen bonding occurred, the codon is not recognized as a stop codon.

A very important residue in eRF1 is the Cys127 in the YxxCxxxF motif, which forms 2 hydrogen bonds with a Watson and Crick's edge located on the mRNA. The hydrogen bonding allows further stability of the eRF1-stop codon complex in multiple orientations and allows stacking/hydrogen bonding of the +2 and +3 position of the stop codon. The strength and number of the stacks on the second and third position allows eRF1 to discriminate stop codons from sense codons.

The GTS site has the ability to assume two conformations depending on the interaction of adenine or guanine. For the stop codon UAG, the Thr32 from the GTS site will hydrogen bond with the guanine in the +3 position. If the stop codon has guanine in the second position (UGA), the YxxCxxxF motif stacks on the codon which causes the GTS site to face away from codon.

=== Nonsense mutations ===
Nearly 11% of all inherited genetic disorders are caused by premature stop codon (nonsense mutations). Notable examples of nonsense mutations that have received extensive research are the CFTR, which causes cystic fibrosis, and dystrophin mutations, which causes Duchenne muscular dystrophy. Recent therapeutic research has focused on forcing readthrough of premature stop codons. This would allow the previously mutated mRNA strand to potentially code for a correctly folded protein. A common method of forcing readthrough is to limit the activity of eRF1 and eRF3. One mechanism proposed limiting the concentrations of eRF1 and eRF3 in the cells, which would theoretically reduce stop codon recognition. However, this mechanism has not been used in therapeutic remedies. Instead the most promising mechanism involves chemical degradation of eRF1 to achieve readthrough. These chemicals are under the branch of drugs called readthrough promoters. The mechanism of readthrough promoters vary, however a common mechanism is to prevent eRF1 from releasing out of the ribosome. This results in a stalled ribosome then finally a collision with another ribosome.

== Mechanism of termination ==
=== Termination complex ===
Once eRF1 recognizes the stop codon and binds to the ribosome, eRF1 is ready for the final steps of termination: hydrolysis of the peptide bond. In order to release the polypeptide from the p site of the ribosome, an additional protein, energy source, and ions are needed to aid eRF1, which is achieved by forming a quaternary complex. The additional protein is eRF3, which is a GTPase, the energy source is a GTP molecule, and the ion is a Mg^{2+}. Once eRF3 is bound to eRF1, its affinity for GTP increases significantly compared to the affinity of a solo eRF3 protein. It is worth noting that stop codon recognition does not require GTP, whereas hydrolysis of peptidyl tRNA and release of the termination complex does require GTP.

=== Role of eRF3 ===
There have been many hypotheses on the function of eRF3 in the termination complex. An early hypothesis was that eRF3 helped eRF1 bind to the stop codon since eRF3 was structurally similar to EF-TU, which is a GTPase that brings charged tRNA molecules to the aminoacyl site of the ribosome in prokaryotic cells. Other hypothesis focus on the effects of GTP hydrolysis, which is mediated by eRF3, on eRF1. The pre-hydrolyzed GTP configuration of the termination complex favors eRF1 binding to the stop codon and orientating eRF1 to the peptide tRNA. The post-hydrolyzed GDP configuration promotes the release of the complex and dissociation of the ribosome.

Additional studies hypothesis that the hydrolysis of GTP due to eRF3 allows the catalytic site of eRF1 to enter the p-site of the ribosome thus promoting the release of the nascent polypeptide.

=== GGQ catalytic site ===
The catalytic site that is responsible for the hydrolysis of the peptidyl tRNA is the GGQ site on eRF1. Current understanding of the GGQ site states that it enters the P-site of the ribosome, which is where the peptidyl tRNA is located, after a conformational change caused by the hydrolysis of GTP by eRF3. Furthermore, any mutation to the GGQ site renders eRF1 nonfunctional, thus the cells ability to successfully terminate Translation. This is due to the two glycine residues in GGQ to adopt a torsional angle that is only possible with two glycines. Without the proper angle, the active site for the reaction won't be able to function properly. In order nascent protein to be released the GGQ site needs to recruit a water molecule into the active site of the reaction. The method of recruitment for a single water molecule is still not understood completely. Once in position, the water molecule acts as a nucleophile, and attacks the carbonyl group of the ester bond between the nascent protein and the tRNA. The hydrolysis of the ester bond causes the release of the nascent protein and the disassembly of the ribosome and termination complex.

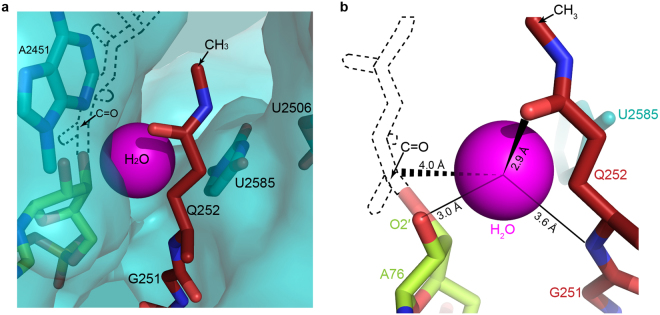
Hydrolysis of ester bond to release nascent protein

== Nonsense mediated decay ==
Since eRF1 has the ability to recognize and bind to stop codons, it has evolved as a key component in mRNA quality surveillance mechanisms. One mechanism of mRNA quality surveillance is the nonsense mediated decay (NMD) pathway.

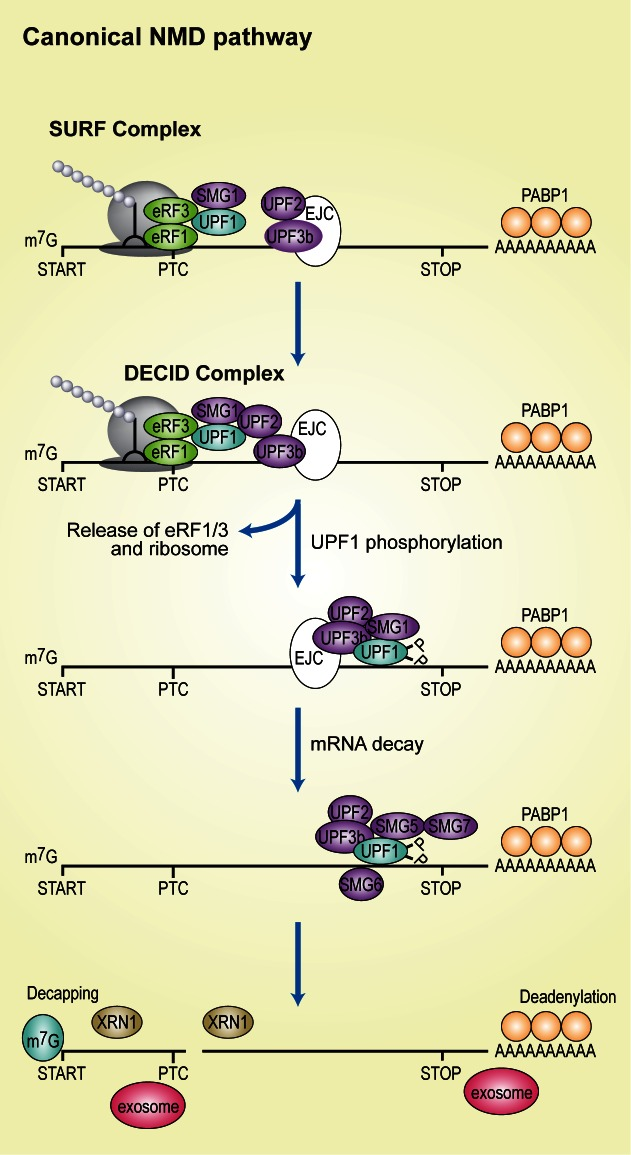
Mechanistic steps of Nonsense Mediated Decay pathway

NMD is used to protect the cell from producing harmful truncated proteins resulting from nonsense mutations. NMD has recently been found to impact cell differentiation of stem cells due to the decay of mRNA encoding factors. The NMD pathway differentiates premature termination codons (PTC) from normal stop codons by only attacking presliced mRNA strands. This means that the mRNA contains exons and introns in the strand. This is because the machinery for NMD recognizes exon-junctions complexes. Unlike translational termination, NMD utilizes many intermediate protein complexes to achieve mRNA decay. The initial step of NMD is the construction of the SURP complex. This complex is composed of 4 proteins: SMG-1, Upf1, eRF1, and eRF3 (SURF). The complex is formed when Upf1 binds to SMG-1, which then clamps onto the eRF1 and eRF3 termination complex. The SURF complex then associates with a downstream complex composed of Upf2, Upf3, and EJC to create a new complex: Decay-Inducing Complex (DECID). Upon the joining of the two complexes, the DECID complex dissociates eRF1, eRF3, and the ribosome. The new complex contains EJC, Upf2, Upf3, SMG-1, and a phosphorylated Upf1. The phosphorylated Upf1 protein attracts additional SMG proteins, which are in the endonuclease enzymatic family. The SMG protein then cleaves the mRNA strand near the premature stop codon. This event is essentially decapping the protective head group on the mRNA strand, which will cause the rest of the strand to be degraded by exosomes.

=== eRF1 Independent mRNA Surveillance ===
NMD is not the only pathway for mRNA surveillance. The No-Go Decay (NGD) pathway is used to degrade mRNA strands that do not have a functional stop codon. This mechanism uses two proteins, Dom34p and Hbs1p, that are very similar to eRF1 and eRF3 respectively. The Dom34p and Hbs1p proteins recognize stalled ribosomes to trigger endonucleolytic cleavage. The Non-Stop Decay (NSD) is another pathway that deals with mRNA strands that dont have a functional stop codon. This mechanism does not include eRF1 but does include the eRF3 homologous Ski7p protein. This mechanism is dependent on a poly-A tailing synthesized, which stalls the ribosome. The stalled ribosome is then recognized by Ski7p for degradation.
