= Tether (cell biology) =

Form of cell surface protrusion

A tether is a form of cell surface protrusion, separated from the cytoskeleton after the application of low pulling forces to the cell surface membrane. They are thin, viscoelastic tubes which can be observed in vivo due to shear flow caused by molecular bonds between blood cells and vessel walls, for example.

In biochemistry, a tether is a molecule that carries one or two carbon intermediates from one active site to another. They are commonly used in lipid synthesis, gluconeogenesis, and the conversion of pyruvate into Acetyl CoA via PDH complex. Common tethers are lipoate -lysine residue complex associated with dihydrolipoyl transacetylase, which is used for carrying hydroxyethyl from hydroxyethyl TPP. This compound forms Acetyl- CoA, a convergent molecule in metabolic pathways.

Another tether is biotin-lysine residue complex associated with pyruvate carboxylase, an enzyme which plays an important role in gluconeogenesis. It is involved in the production of oxaloacetate from pyruvate.

One of the biological tethers used in the synthesis of fats is a β- mercaptoethylamine-pantothenate complex associated with an acyl carrier protein.
